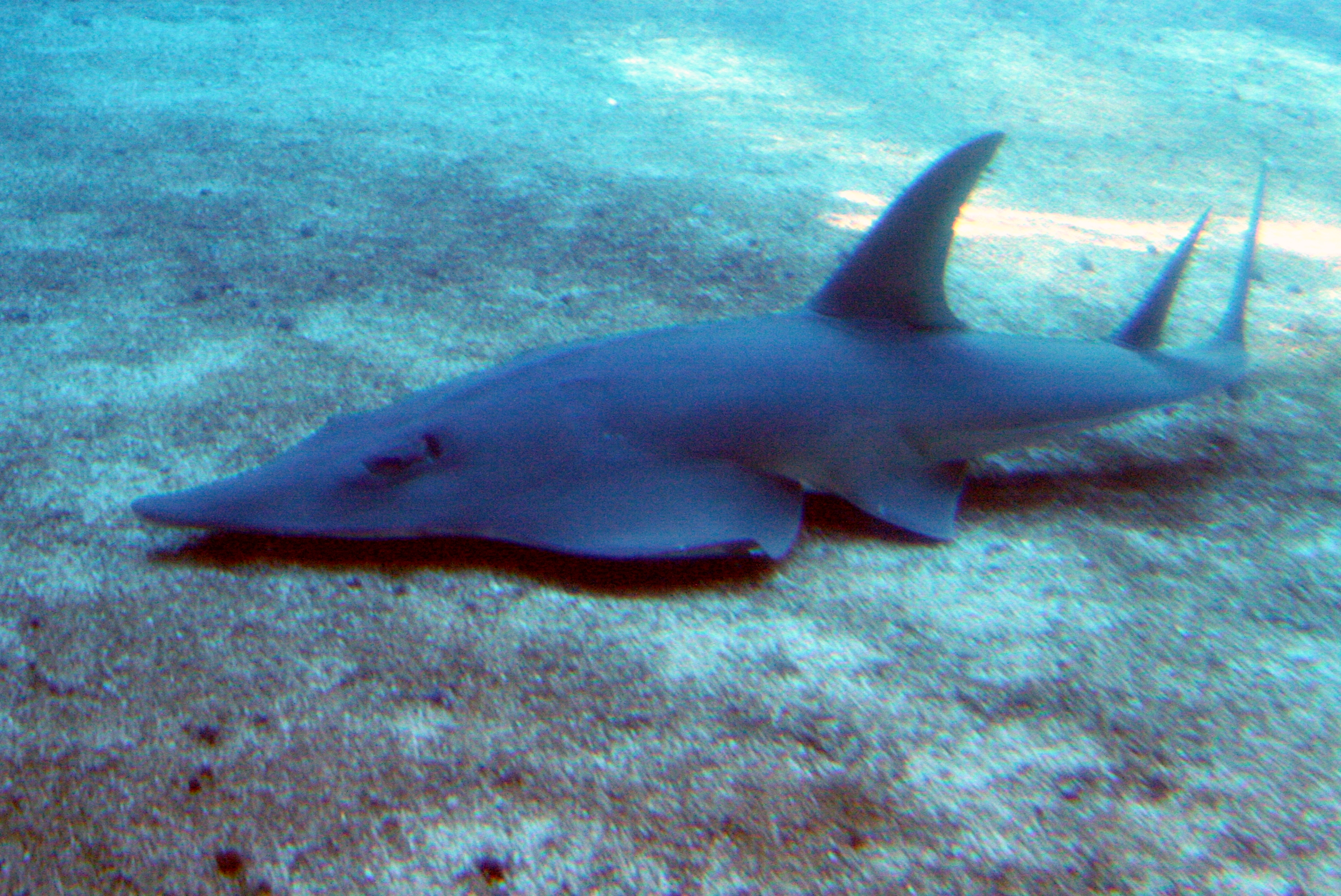

Conservation status
- Critically Endangered (IUCN 3.1)
- CITES Appendix II

Scientific classification
- Kingdom: Animalia
- Phylum: Chordata
- Class: Chondrichthyes
- Subclass: Elasmobranchii
- Order: Rhinopristiformes
- Family: Rhinidae
- Genus: Rhynchobatus
- Species: R. djiddensis

Binomial name
- Rhynchobatus djiddensis Forsskål, 1775

Synonyms
- Raja djiddensis Forsskål, 1775; Rhinchobatus djiddensis (Forsskål, 1775); Rhinobatus djiddensis (Forsskål, 1775); Rhinobatus maculata Ehrenberg, 1829; Rhynchobatis djiddensis (Forsskål, 1775); Rhynchobatus djeddensis (Forsskål, 1775); Rhynchobatus djiddenis (Forsskål, 1775); Rhynchobatus djidensis (Forsskål, 1775); Rhyncobatis djeddensis (Forsskål, 1775); Rhyncobatus djeddensis (Forsskål, 1775); Rhyncobatus djiddensis (Forsskål, 1775)

= Giant guitarfish =

Species of cartilaginous fish

The giant guitarfish (Rhynchobatus djiddensis), also known as the whitespotted wedgefish and the sand skate, is a large species of guitarfish in the family Rhinidae. It is restricted to the Red Sea, Persian Gulf, and western Indian Ocean, but was formerly considered more widespread due to confusion with its relatives.

== Taxonomy and range ==
The giant guitarfish was previously believed to range throughout a large part of the Indo-Pacific, but recent evidence has shown that it, as traditionally defined, actually was a species complex consisting of four different species. In addition to the giant guitarfish, this complex includes the white-spotted guitarfish, the broadnose wedgefish and possibly the smoothnose wedgefish. With these as separate species, the giant guitarfish has a relatively restricted range; it is found only in the Red Sea and Persian Gulf, and the western Indian Ocean as far south as South Africa. Ranging across the western Indian Ocean, it is common to misidentify the separate species of guitarfish within a similar range.

== Description ==
A large fish reaching up to 3.1 m (10 ft) long and weighing as much as 227 kg (500 lb), it is brownish or greyish above with a variable pattern of white spots. Juveniles have a black spot above each pectoral fin, but in adults it is a dusky ring or absent. There is a dark, bar-like pattern between the eyes (on top of the head), which separates it from the other Rhynchobatus species in its range. In addition to this, the guitarfish can also be characterized by the large black eyespots on the pectoral bases and a distinct pointed snout.

The species may be confused with the distantly related common shovelnose ray, from which it differs in a smaller first dorsal fin set farther back on the body; a more rounded head with a prominent snout; a lack of upper jaw indentations; and larger skin denticles.

== Behavior ==
=== Breeding ===
The giant guitarfish is considered ovoviviparous, where the embryos initially feed on the yolk and then receive more nourishment from uterine fluid enriched with mucus which is obtained by means of indirect absorption. Because of their lower fecundity, the giant guitarfish are known to only produce, on average, four pups per litter during the summer.

=== Diet ===
The giant guitarfish feeds on bivalves, crabs, lobsters, squid and small fish.

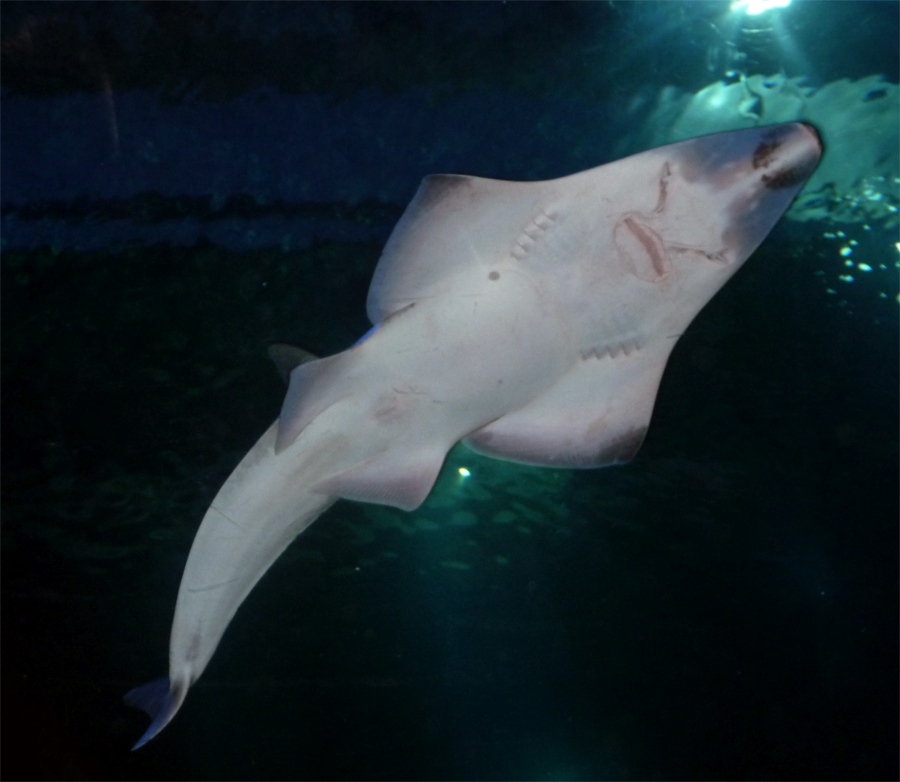
Ventral view.

== Habitat ==
It is a shy fish, found at depths of 2–50 m (6.6–164.0 ft), inhabiting areas with a sandy sea floor. These are generally around coastal reefs or reef flats, but they will sometimes venture into the brackish waters of estuaries.

== Population ==
Giant guitarfishes have been exploited as incidental catch, and as a result, it has led to severe declines, reduced population size, and disappearances. Though the giant is labeled as critically endangered on the IUCN Red List, there is no specific data for the species that could be used to calculate the number of individuals in the decreasing population. Species-specific reporting and identification issues are the two major components as to why no accurate data is kept. Although there's an insufficient data record kept on the exact giant guitarfish population; the harvest rates infer that the species is substantially decreasing while the fishing rates remain stable or even increase. As the human population along the coastlines increase, fishing technology is improved, and the expansion of the fish markets ultimately lead to an increase in fishing effort on a global scale. The highest increases in the fishing industry have occurred around the regions of Asia.

Regarding the catch databases of the giant guitarfish, a research survey from the Gulf of Thailand a ninety-three percent decline in the catch rates of Rhinobathidae, which includes the numerous species of wedgefishes and guitarfishes. From this respective data, the peak catch rate occurred in 1968 to a low in 1972. Additionally, the Indonesian Aru Islands wedgefish gillnet fishery had rapidly expanded their industry from the mid-1970s to its peak in 1987, operating with more than five hundred boats. Shortly afterward, the catch rate of the fish declined significantly and only a hundred boats remained in the area by 1996. By 1992, a wedgefish fishery in the Arafura Sea had been withdrawn because the area had been significantly overfished and the Indonesian investors only obtained limited returns from their investment.

Concerning the catch rates at varying levels of taxonomy, five contemporary datasets are available for accounted data ranging from Iran, Pakistan, India, and Indonesia. Though it's uncertain, these datasets most likely include various species of giant guitarfishes, and each probable species is listed within the collected data. Raje and Zacharia 2009, an included dataset, doesn't include the count of giant guitarfishes but rather represents the landing data of myliobatid rays including stingrays, butterfly rays, devil rays, and eagle rays. Although this dataset doesn't specifically account for the giant guitarfish population, the collected data can be utilized to infer the decline of giant guitarfishes considering they share the same distributions, habitat, and susceptibility to capture as the several species of myliobatid rays. Overall, the collected data is utilized to calculate proportional declines, annual change in population, and the reduction of the giant guitarfishes over the three generations of complementary data.

One of the primary landings data for the "giant guitarfish" category are available from Iran including data ranging from 1997 to 2016. This specific dataset most likely includes all rhinids and glaucostegids occurring locally. From this dataset, it shows that the landings declined by sixty-six percent over the twenty years, which is approximately ninety-one percent of a population reduction over the last three generations of larger glaucostegid species. In addition to the data collected from Iran, Pakistan includes the landing data for the "rhinobatid" category spanning from 1993 to 2011, covering the country's two coastal provinces. Data from the Sindh province showed a seventy-two percent decrease from peak landings in 1999 to a low in 2011. In addition to the Sindh province, data showed an eighty-one percent decrease from landings in 1994 to a low in 2011 in the Balochistan province. These decreases are the equivalent of ninety-eight to ninety-nine percent population reduction over the last three generations of larger glaucostegid species.

Although they're not the same species as the giant guitarfish, the catch data of the myliobatid rays in western India serves a crucial component when determining the guitarfish population decrease. The catch data of the myliobatid rays in western India was compiled from 1990 to 2004. The catch rate of the rays declined by approximately sixty-three percent during this time period. However, the fishing effort had doubled over this time, which would be the equivalent of a ninety-five percent population reduction over the three generations for glaucostegid species.

In addition to the landings data compiled from western India, landings data of "guitarfishes" is available from Tamil Nadu, located in eastern India and the data was collected from 2002 to 2006. This compiled data is unique because it includes different species of guitarfish such as the giant guitarfish, clubnose guitarfish, sharpnose Guitarfish, and widenose guitarfish. Although this time period is too short to extract an equivalent population reduction over three generations, it was concluded that landings declined by eighty-six percent during this particular time period. Apart from landings data collected in India, data collected for whitespotted wedgefishes is available from Indonesia that was recorded from 2005 to 2015. Though it is possible that this dataset indicated a large majority of giant guitarfishes, the trends of the data can be considered representative of glaucostegids as well as rhinids. During this time period, landings declined by over eighty-eight percent, which is equivalent to a ninety-nine percent or greater population reduction over the last three generations of the giant guitarfish (approximately forty-five years). However, one of the most crucial data points obtained in 2016 was excluded from this particular analysis. The compiled data in 2016 indicated a drastic increase in reported landings which may suggest an even greater decrease in the species.

The one region where the giant guitarfish may be more stable than the other areas would be Australia, where fishing effort is relatively low and conservation efforts are utilized more. Turtle exclusion devices are specialized devices that promote sea turtle conservation by addressing interactions between sea turtles and trawl fishing gear. These devices not only benefit the sea turtles in the surrounding areas, but also benefit the species of rays and guitarfish as well. They've demonstrated to reduce catches by ninety-four percent and there are controls on their catch and retention. Estimates of fishing mortality rates in the Northern Prawn Fishery for similar species are well below those that would ultimately lead to significant population declines. From this, the giant guitarfish remains a common inshore and coastal batoid of northern Australia. Fishing pressure is exceptionally high across the range of this species, and although the collected datasets are outside the range of the giant guitarfish, they can be considered representative of the population reduction for the species throughout the Indo-West Pacific region. Australia, Papua New Guinea, and the Solomon Islands provide sufficient conservation for the species, but the proportion of this region compared to the global range isn't adequate to substantially lower the assessment. From a global perspective, its inferred that the giant guitarfish species has undergone over an eighty percent population reduction over the last three generations and why the species is labeled as critically endangered.

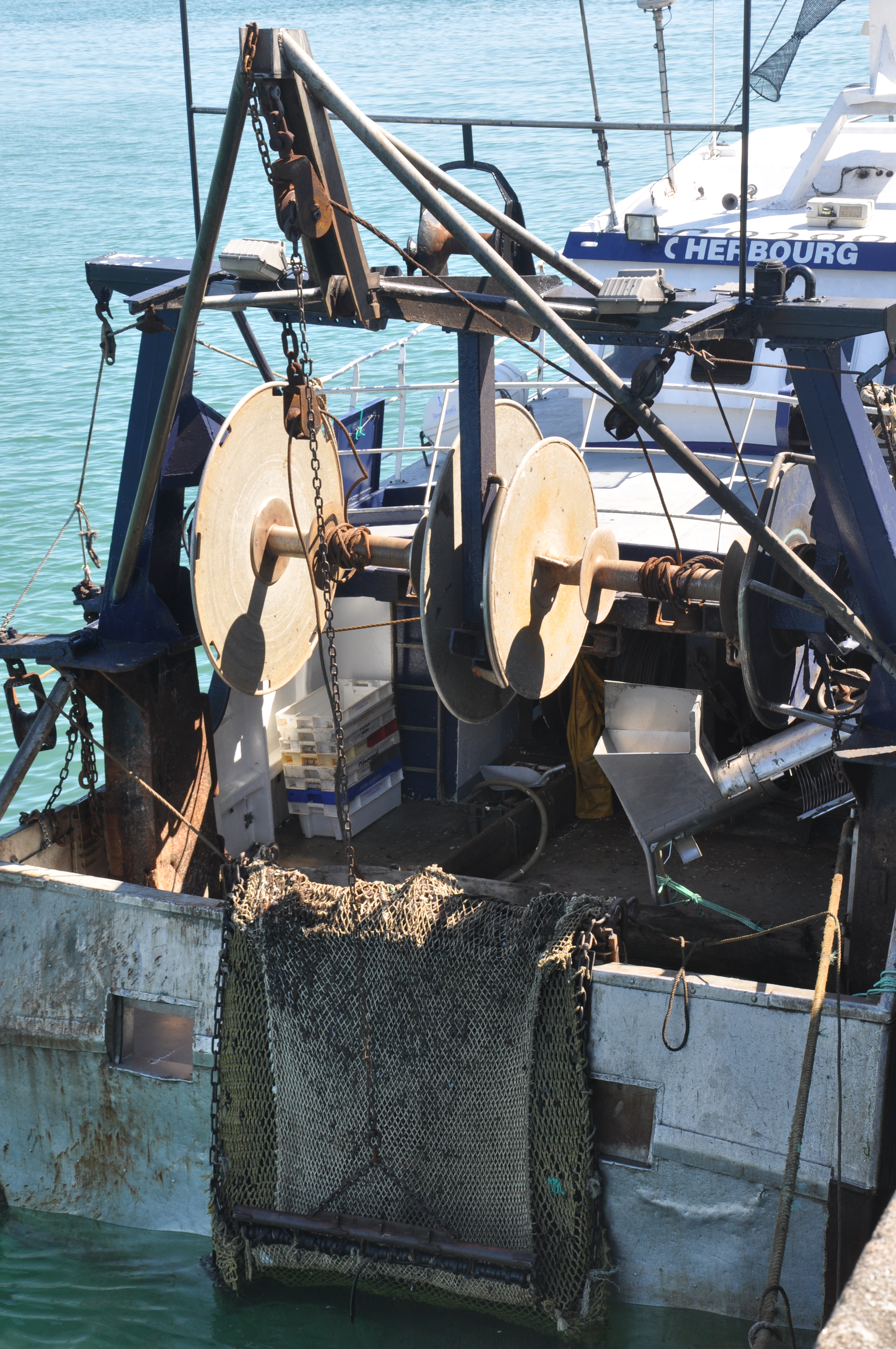
A commercial fishing boat utilizing a trawler

== Threats ==
On a global perspective, giant guitarfishes are subject to intense fishing pressure on their coastal and shelf habitats, which are unregulated across the majority of their distribution range. The giant guitarfishes are captured in industrial, artisanal, and subsistence fisheries with multiple fishing methods including, gillnetting, trawling, traditional hook and line, trapping, and seine netting. After capture, the giant guitarfishes are generally retained for their meat and fins. There is an exceptionally high level of fisheries resource use and increasing fishing pressure across the range of the giant guitarfish, and demersal coastal fisheries resources have been severely depleted in crucial areas of the Indo-West Pacific, including India and other regions of Southeast Asia. Apart from these designated areas, fishing pressure is substantially lower in northern Australia.

From a general census, fishing effort and the number of fishers has increased in recent decades across the range of the giant guitarfish species, with the demand for shark and ray product increasing over the same time period due to the shark fin trade. An example of the increase in fisheries would be the Indian state of Gujarat. In Gujarat, the number of trawlers increased approximately 6,600 in the early 2000s to 11,582 in 2010. All Indian states have an exceptionally large number of trawlers. As of 2010, Maharashtra has 5,613 trawlers, Kerala has 3,678 trawlers, and Tamil Nadu has 5,767. Given the compiled trawlers across India, there's a total of 35,228 trawlers that are utilized in India's fisheries industries. Along with the high numbers of trawlers, over 20,257 gillnetters are established across India and most countries have a significant number of fishing fleets operating in the coastal waters. For instance, Sri Lanka had 24,600 gillnet vessels operating in 2004 and Indonesia had approximately 600,000 fishing vessels operating in the marine waters. As of today, the numbers of the operating vessels are only estimated to be higher than before.

Sharks and rays, including giant guitarfishes, are often targeted and are now heavily exploited across the regions by netting and trawl fisheries, and increasing fishing effort has put a significant amount of pressure on all the guitarfish species in the Indo-West Pacific. In addition to this, the high value of fins is the utmost driving retention and trade of giant guitarfishes globally. The giant guitarfish is landed heavily throughout its range and several countries within the distribution of this species rank among the top twenty shark fishing nations globally. Specifically, countries such as Indonesia, India, Malaysia, Taiwan, Thailand, and Sri Lanka share the giant guitarfish's distribution and are countries that have gained a massive reputation for fisheries industries.

== Interaction with man ==
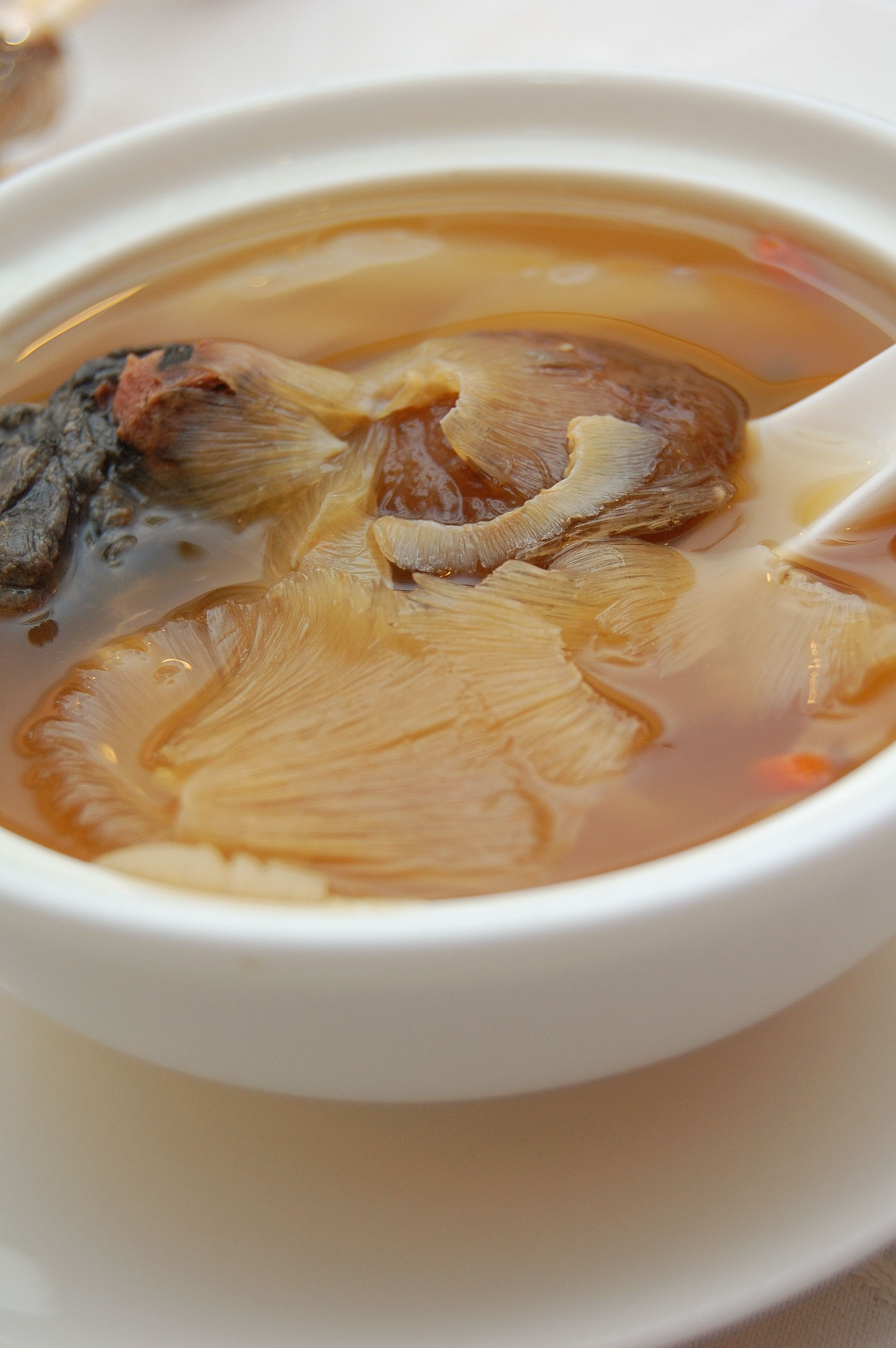
A dish of shark fin soup, a Chinese cuisine for special occasions

=== General ===
The giant guitarfish is harmless to humans. It is listed as critically endangered on the IUCN Red List as its population is believed to have declined significantly due to unregulated high levels of exploitation for its flesh and fins, the latter for shark fin soup. Although finning has been prohibited in the eastern Pacific, fins are still traded when the guitarfish is landed. Its low fecundity and presumed slow growth rate make it highly vulnerable to unsustainable exploitation.

=== Fin Trade and Consumption ===
When caught as either targeted or bycatch, the giant guitarfish is kept by fisheries due to the value of their fins. Along the coasts of their distribution range, they're consumed by the locals, but dorsal and caudal fins are often sought through the international shark fin trade. China, among other Asian communities, is one of the nations with the highest demand for the fins of wedgefishes and giant guitarfishes. Shark fin soup is considered a common dish for special occasions in Chinese culture. Apart from the consumption of the species as a traditional dish, wedgefishes and giant guitarfishes are also used for medicinal purposes as well. Profiting at over US$964 per kilogram in Hong Kong, Qun Chi is the most valuable in the fin market.

=== Viridae Presence ===
Cartilaginous fish, such as the giant guitarfish, have evolved from one of the most ancient lineages from over 400 million years ago and possess potentially the best immune systems in the animal kingdom. The guitarfish adomavirus was discovered which is distantly related polyomaviruses. A juvenile male giant guitarfish was caught and transported to an aquarium, where it began to develop skin lesions. From this, biopsy samples were obtained for further testing utilizing electron microscopy to interpret the cause. Over an eighteen-week period, the skin lesions dissipated, and the specimen remained healthy over the next ten weeks after the lesions completely resolved. During those ten weeks, more samples were collected to ensure stability in the fish's health.

== Conservation Efforts ==
As of today, there are limited conservation efforts or management regulations established for the giant guitarfish. The practice of finning is now prohibited in all administrations in Australia. Along with this, general fisheries management and protected areas will most likely benefit the giant guitarfish in Australia.
