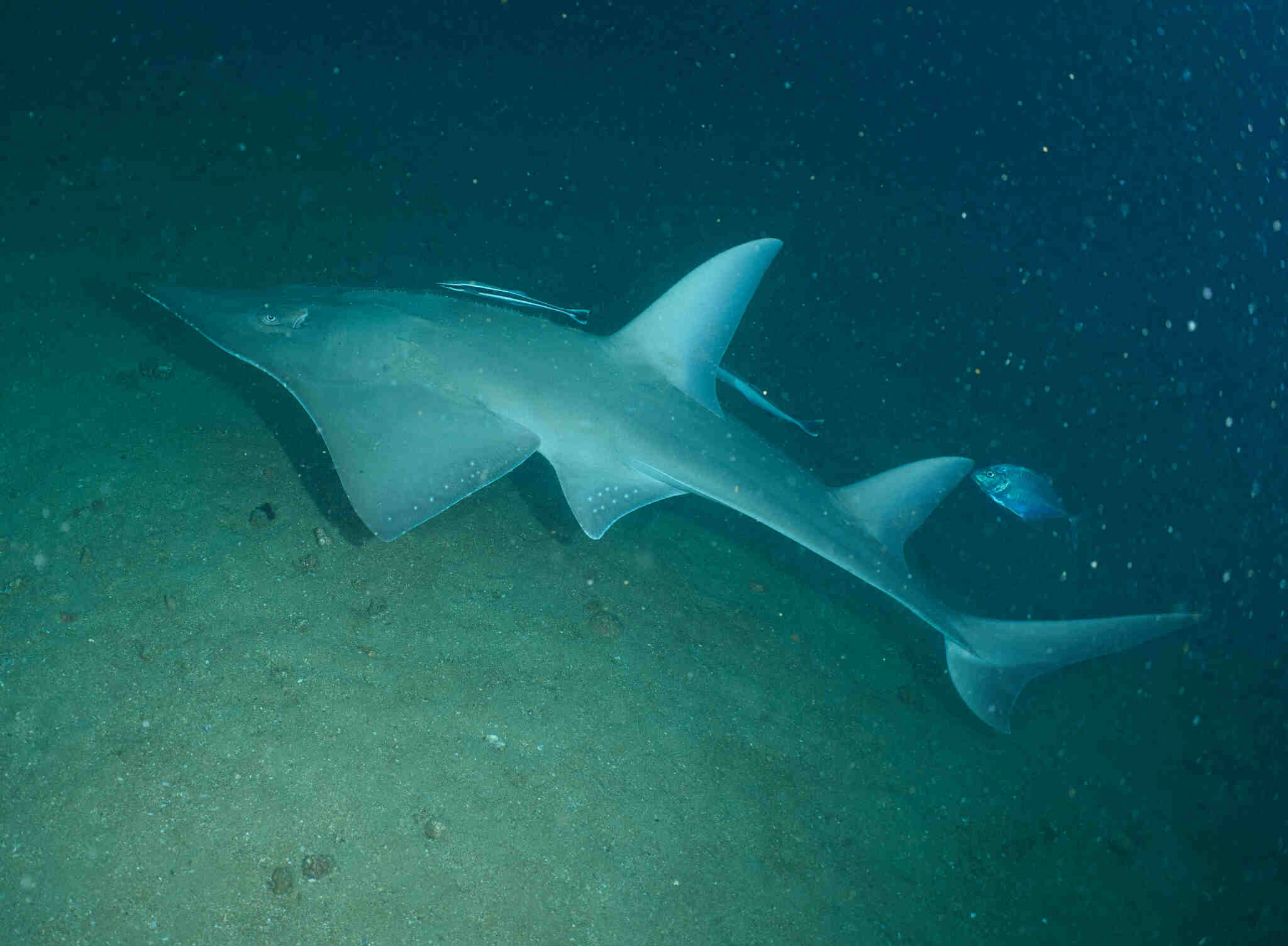

Conservation status
- Critically Endangered (IUCN 3.1)
- CITES Appendix II

Scientific classification
- Kingdom: Animalia
- Phylum: Chordata
- Class: Chondrichthyes
- Subclass: Elasmobranchii
- Order: Rhinopristiformes
- Family: Rhinidae
- Genus: Rhynchobatus
- Species: R. australiae

Binomial name
- Rhynchobatus australiae Whitley, 1939
- IUCN range of Rhynchobatus australiae Extant (resident)

= Rhynchobatus australiae =

Species of cartilaginous fish

Rhynchobatus australiae, also called the white-spotted guitarfish, white-spotted wedgefish or bottlenose wedgefish, is a species of fish in the Rhinidae family. It is found from shallow waters to a depth of at least 60 m (200 ft) in the Indo-Pacific, ranging from the East African coast and the Red Sea, to Taiwan, the Philippines and Australia. It is part of a species complex that also includes the giant guitarfish, the broadnose wedgefish and possibly the smoothnose wedgefish.

== Anatomy and appearance ==
Rhynchobatus australiae reaches about 3 m (10 ft) in length. Juveniles and young adults are greyish or brownish above with a sparse covering of white spots and a black spot above each pectoral fin. There are three white spots above each black spot. Large adults are considerably darker, sometimes appearing almost black above, and the spots seen is younger individuals are typically not easily visible.

Its tail fin has distinct upper and lower lobes, unlike the fiddler and shovelnose rays, where the lower lobe is reduced. Its snout is acutely pointed, merging into the flat triangular pectoral fins. Gills are on the underside of the head. The first (anterior) dorsal fin is in line with the pelvic fins, and there is a row of thorns along the dorsal midline.
