= Rhynchobatus immaculatus =

Conservation status
- Critically Endangered (IUCN 3.1)
- CITES Appendix II (CITES)

Scientific classification
- Domain: Eukaryota
- Kingdom: Animalia
- Phylum: Chordata
- Class: Chondrichthyes
- Subclass: Elasmobranchii
- Order: Rhinopristiformes
- Family: Rhinidae
- Genus: Rhynchobatus
- Species: R. immaculatus

Binomial name
- Rhynchobatus immaculatus Last, H. C. Ho & R. R. Chen, 2013

Species of cartilaginous fish

Rhynchobatus immaculatus, the Taiwanese wedgefish, is a species of fish in the family Rhinidae. It is found in the Pacific Ocean in the vicinity of Taiwan. This species reaches a length of 99 cm (39 in).
