= Glaucostegus younholeei =

Bangladeshi guitarfish

Conservation status
- Critically Endangered (IUCN 3.1)

Scientific classification
- Kingdom: Animalia
- Phylum: Chordata
- Class: Chondrichthyes
- Subclass: Elasmobranchii
- Order: Rhinopristiformes
- Family: Glaucostegidae
- Genus: Glaucostegus
- Species: G. younholeei

Binomial name
- Glaucostegus younholeei Habib & Islam, 2021

Species of fish

Glaucostegus younholeei, the Bangladeshi guitarfish, is a type of guitarfish of the family Glaucostegidae found in the northern Bay of Bengal, Bangladesh. This species is recorded from 13 specimens discovered in a fish landing center in Cox's Bazar. It is currently witnessing a population decline of more than 80 percent due to high exploitation rate.

== Description ==
The Bangladeshi guitarfish can be differentiated from its congeners from these characteristics: long and narrow blunt pointed snout, broad oblique nostrils with the narrow anterior opening, brownish or greyish body color with a narrow wedge-shaped disc, cranium margin sharply demarcated before eyes, rostral ridges almost joined along their entire length, relatively longer tail. The maximum length of this species is only around 93 cm (37 in).

== Habitat and distribution ==
This guitarfish possibly inhabits shallow coastal and continental shelf waters of less than 120 m (394 ft). The specific geographic distribution range can not fully determined since it has only been recorded from one landing site in Bangladesh. However, there are some presumptions that Bangladeshi guitarfish may be more wide-ranging and live in the adjacent areas, including Andaman Sea and Strait of Malacca.

Giant guitarfish, especially the smaller species (including the Bangladeshi guitarfish), is locally captured for international fin and meat trade.
