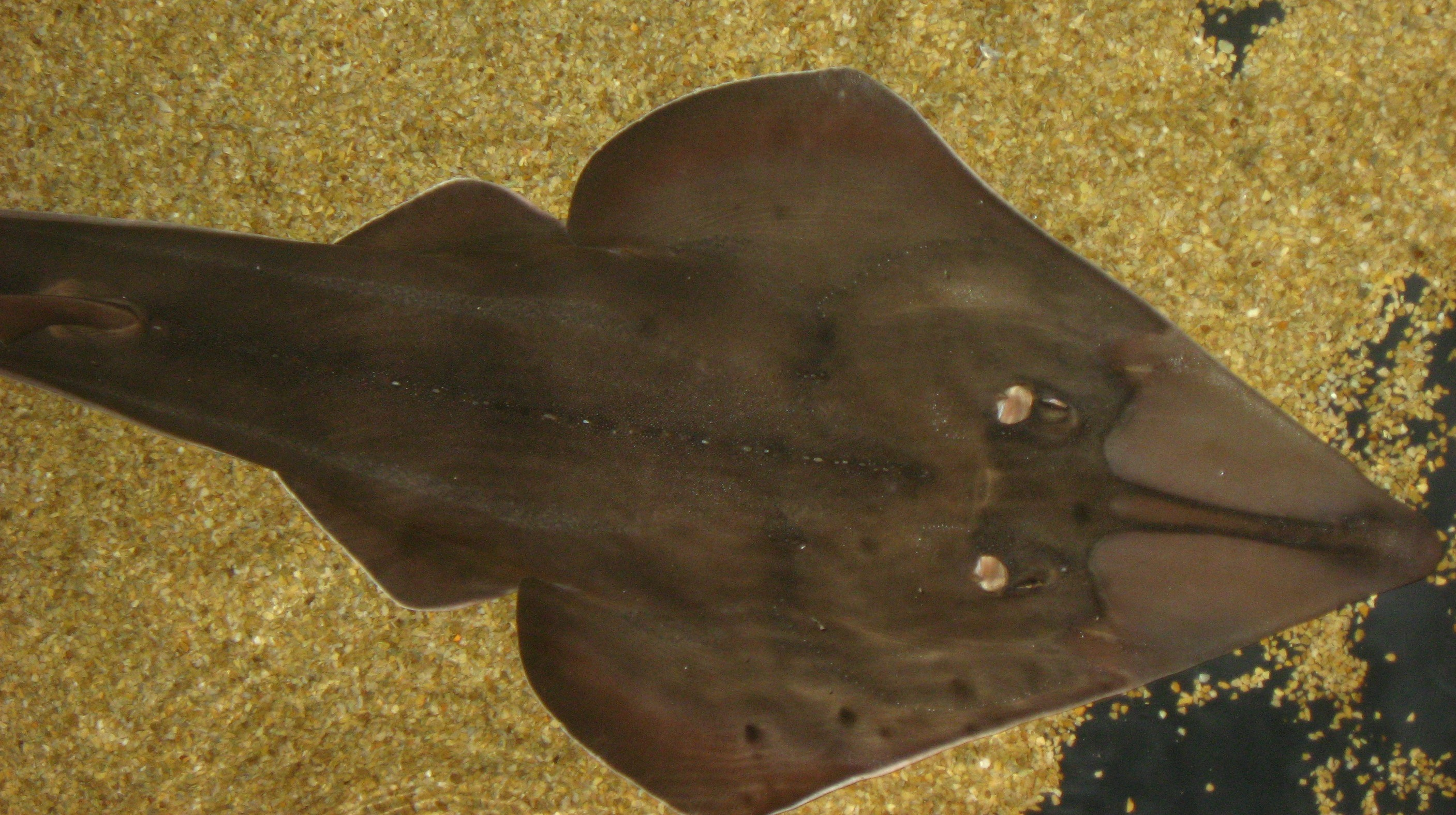

Conservation status
- Critically Endangered (IUCN 3.1)
- CITES Appendix II

Scientific classification
- Kingdom: Animalia
- Phylum: Chordata
- Class: Chondrichthyes
- Subclass: Elasmobranchii
- Order: Rhinopristiformes
- Family: Glaucostegidae
- Genus: Glaucostegus
- Species: G. cemiculus

Binomial name
- Glaucostegus cemiculus Geoffroy Saint-Hilaire, 1817

Synonyms
- Glaucostegus petiti (Chabanaud, 1929); Rhinobatos cemiculus rasus Garman, 1908; Rhinobatos congolensis Giltay, 1928; Rhinobatos rasus Garman, 1908; Rhinobatus cemiculus Geoffroy Saint-Hilaire, 1817; Rhinobatus congolensis Giltay, 1928; Rhinobatus rasus Garman, 1908

= Blackchin guitarfish =

Species of cartilaginous fish

The blackchin guitarfish (Glaucostegus cemiculus, formerly Rhinobatos cemiculus) is a species of cartilaginous fish in the family Rhinobatidae. It is native to the eastern Atlantic Ocean and the Mediterranean Sea. It is a bottom-dwelling fish feeding on crustaceans, other invertebrates and fish. The females give birth to live young. Its lifestyle makes it vulnerable to trawling and other fishing methods, populations seem to be declining and it is subject to intensive fishing pressure, with its fins being sold into the Asian market. The International Union for Conservation of Nature has assessed its conservation status as being "critically endangered".

== Description ==
The blackchin guitarfish is plain brown above and white below, and has a black blotch on its snout, more noticeable in juveniles than adult fish. It is similar in appearance to the common guitarfish (Rhinobatos rhinobatos) which is sympatric (shares the same range). Characteristic differences include the blackchin's smaller eyes, narrower rostral ridges (nearly united at the front), shorter front nasal lobe and narrower back nasal flap. Both species have short thorns present on the inner margins of the eye, on the shoulders and along the spine and tail, but these are less distinct in the blackchin. This species grows to a length of about 180 cm (71 in), although larger fish have been reported from Guinea in West Africa and the Gulf of Gabès in the southern Mediterranean.

== Distribution ==
The blackchin guitarfish is found in eastern Atlantic Ocean between about 42°N and 17°S, 19°W and 36°E. Its northerly limit is the northern coast of Portugal and its southern limit is Angola. It is also found in southern and eastern Mediterranean Sea and has been recently recorded in the Black Sea. It lives on the continental shelf at depths down to about 100 m (330 ft).

== Ecology ==
The blackchin guitarfish swims slowly over sandy and muddy stretches of seabed, foraging for shrimps, crabs, other crustaceans, squid and molluscs. Males reach sexual maturity at a length of about 150 cm (59 in) in Senegal, and females at about 163 cm (64 in), while in Tunisia the lengths at maturity are 100 cm (39 in) and 110 cm (43 in) respectively. This fish is ovoviviparous, the eggs being retained in the uterus of the female and the developing young being nourished first by a yolk sac, and later by uterine secretions. Litter size varies between about four and six in Senegal, but larger litters occur in Tunisia. The gestation period is between about five and eight months, there sometimes being a diapause in the embryo's development in colder-water months in Senegal, but no diapause seems to occur in Tunisia.

== Status ==
The blackchin guitarfish is a low-fecundity fish and mature individuals aggregate off the coast seasonally to deliver their young and mate. At this time, they are particularly vulnerable to fishing activity. This species is particularly valued for its fins which sell at a high price, but the fish are also used for food. They are caught by trawling and gillnets in artisanal fisheries and as bycatch during industrial shrimp fishing. Along with the common guitarfish, they used to be plentiful in the northern Mediterranean and around the Balearic Islands, but seem to no longer be present in these areas. Catches off the coast of Africa have declined also, but data on landings is in short supply. The International Union for Conservation of Nature is concerned about the future of this fish and has assessed its conservation status as being "critically endangered".
