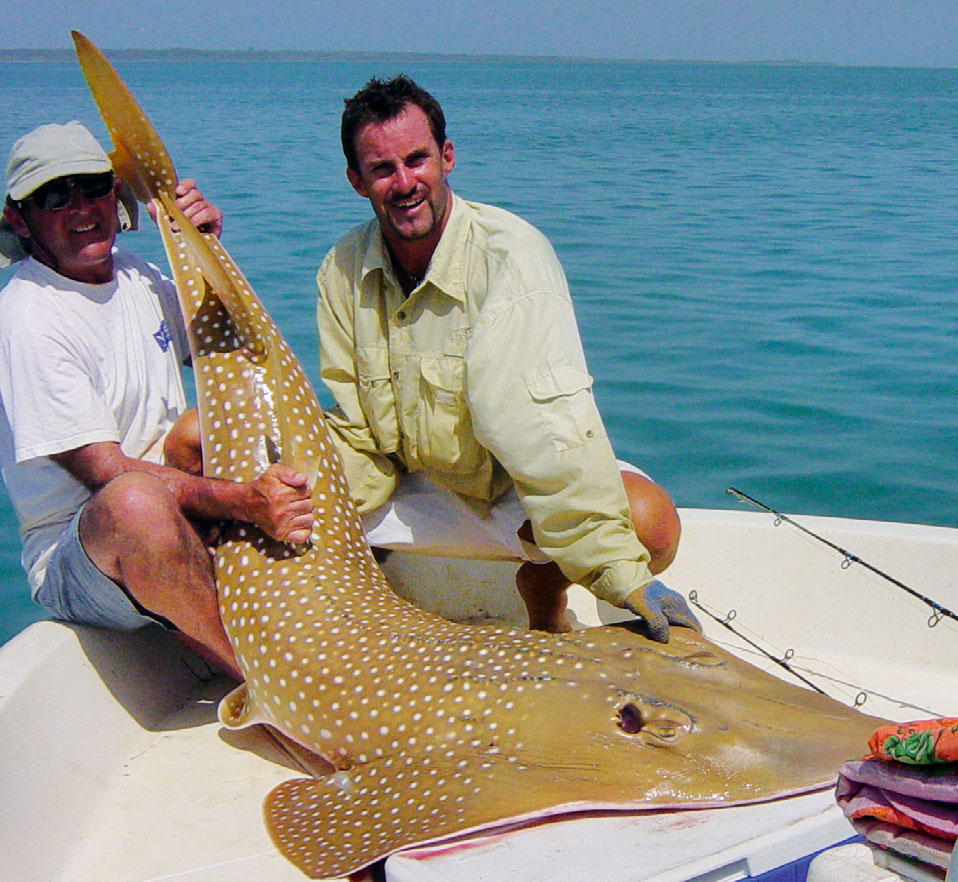

Conservation status
- Critically Endangered (IUCN 3.1)
- CITES Appendix II

Scientific classification
- Kingdom: Animalia
- Phylum: Chordata
- Class: Chondrichthyes
- Subclass: Elasmobranchii
- Order: Rhinopristiformes
- Family: Rhinidae
- Genus: Rhynchobatus
- Species: R. luebberti

Binomial name
- Rhynchobatus luebberti Ehrenbaum, 1915

= African wedgefish =

Species of cartilaginous fish

The African wedgefish, guitarra, Lubbert's guitarfish, or spikenose wedgefish (Rhynchobatus luebberti) is a species of fish in the Rhinidae family. It is the only species in its genus to occur in the East Atlantic.

== Etymology ==
The fish is named in honor of Hans Julius Lübbert (1870–1951), a German fisheries inspector.

== Description ==
African wedgefish have a pale olive-brown or olive-grey color with white spots spread across their back. The edges of their fins are sometimes paler in color. They have a cluster of three black marks on each side of a ridge that runs along their back. Another dark mark can be found each one of these marks. The area around each fish's eye is lighter, reminiscent of a mask. The fish have ridges near their front that possess a row of thorns.

The African wedgefish has a maximum total length of about 3 m (9.8 ft), but are usually 1.5 m (4.9 ft) long. They have 172–176 free vertebral centra.

== Distribution and habitat ==
The fish is found in the warm East Atlantic in Angola, Benin, Cameroon, the Republic of the Congo, the Democratic Republic of the Congo, Ivory Coast, Equatorial Guinea, Gabon, Gambia, Ghana, Guinea, Guinea-Bissau, Liberia, Mauritania, Nigeria, Senegal, Sierra Leone, and Togo.

Its natural habitats are shallow seas, coral reefs, estuarine waters, and coastal saline lagoons.

== Diet ==
The African wedgefish preys upon small bony fish and invertebrates.

== Life history ==
=== Early life ===
African wedgefish are ovoviviparous—eggs remain inside the mother until hatching. Embryos initially feed on yolk. Afterward, they receive nutrition from their mother by absorbing uterine fluid that contains mucus, fat, or protein through specialized structures.

== Conservation ==
The African wedgefish is currently critically endangered.

=== Threats ===
It is threatened by habitat loss and poachers.
