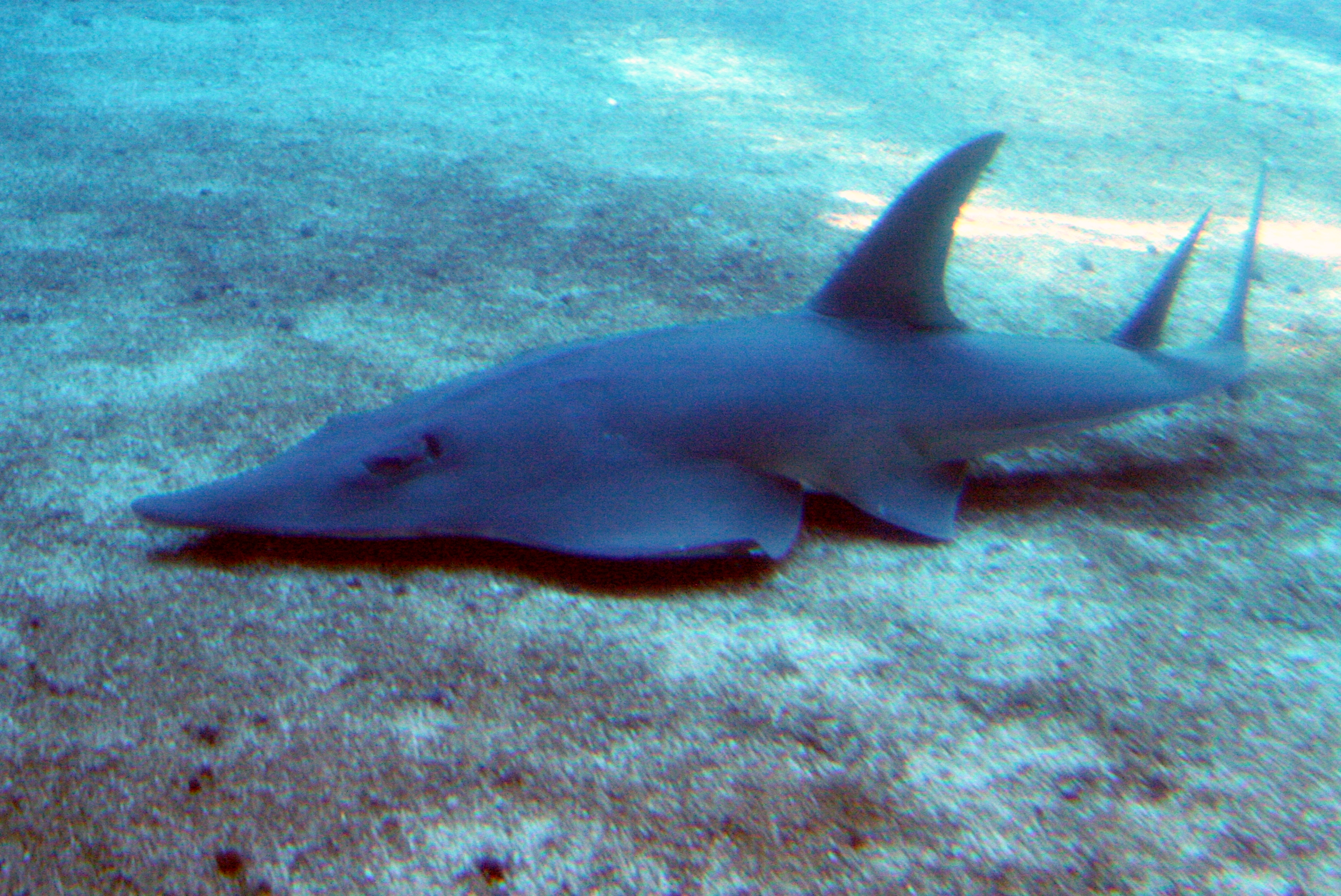
- Whitespotted wedgefish (Rhynchobatus djiddensis)

Scientific classification
- Kingdom: Animalia
- Phylum: Chordata
- Class: Chondrichthyes
- Subclass: Elasmobranchii
- Order: Rhinopristiformes
- Family: Rhinidae; J. P. Müller & Henle, 1841

Genera
- Rhina; Rhynchobatus; Rhynchorhina

= Wedgefish =

Wedgefishes

Family of cartilaginous fishes

Wedgefishes are rays of the family Rhinidae, comprising eleven species in three genera. Classified in the order Rhinopristiformes along with guitarfishes and sawfishes, they have also been known as giant guitarfishes or sharkfin guitarfishes.

== Taxonomy ==
- Rhina Bloch & Schneider, 1801
  - Rhina ancylostoma Bloch & Schneider, 1801 (Shark ray)
- Rhynchobatus J. P. Müller & Henle, 1837
  - Rhynchobatus australiae Whitley, 1939 (Bottlenose wedgefish)
  - Rhynchobatus cooki Last, Kyne & Compagno, 2016 (Roughnose wedgefish)
  - Rhynchobatus djiddensis (Forsskål, 1775) (Whitespotted wedgefish)
  - Rhynchobatus immaculatus Last, H.-C.Ho & R.-R. Chen, 2013 (Taiwanese wedgefish)
  - Rhynchobatus laevis (Bloch & Schneider, 1801) (Smoothnose wedgefish)
  - Rhynchobatus luebberti Ehrenbaum, 1915 (African wedgefish)
  - Rhynchobatus mononoke Koeda, Itou, Yamada & Motomura, 2020 (Japanese wedgefish)
  - Rhynchobatus palpebratus Compagno & Last, 2008 (Eyebrow wedgefish)
  - Rhynchobatus springeri Compagno & Last, 2010 (Broadnose wedgefish)
- Rhynchorhina Séret & Naylor, 2016
  - Rhynchorhina mauritaniensis Séret & Naylor, 2016 (False shark ray)
