= Roughnose wedgefish =

Conservation status
- Critically Endangered (IUCN 3.1)
- CITES Appendix II

Scientific classification
- Kingdom: Animalia
- Phylum: Chordata
- Class: Chondrichthyes
- Subclass: Elasmobranchii
- Order: Rhinopristiformes
- Family: Rhinidae
- Genus: Rhynchobatus
- Species: R. cooki

Binomial name
- Rhynchobatus cooki Last, Kyne & Compagno, 2016

Synonyms
- Rhynchobatus compagnoi Last & Kyne, 2016

Species of cartilaginous fish

The roughnose wedgefish (Rhynchobatus cooki) is a species of fish in the Rhinidae family. It is found in Indonesia (off Java) and Singapore. Its natural habitats are open seas, shallow seas, coral reefs, estuarine waters, and coastal saline lagoons. It is threatened by habitat loss. Despite having been known for more than a decade, it remained undescribed until 2016. This is a relatively small species, reaching up to 81 cm (2.66 ft) in length. Adults are greenish-brown above; young have white spots.

The fish is named in honor of Sidney F. Cook (1953-1997), a shark fisheries biologist, and a leader in shark conservation.
