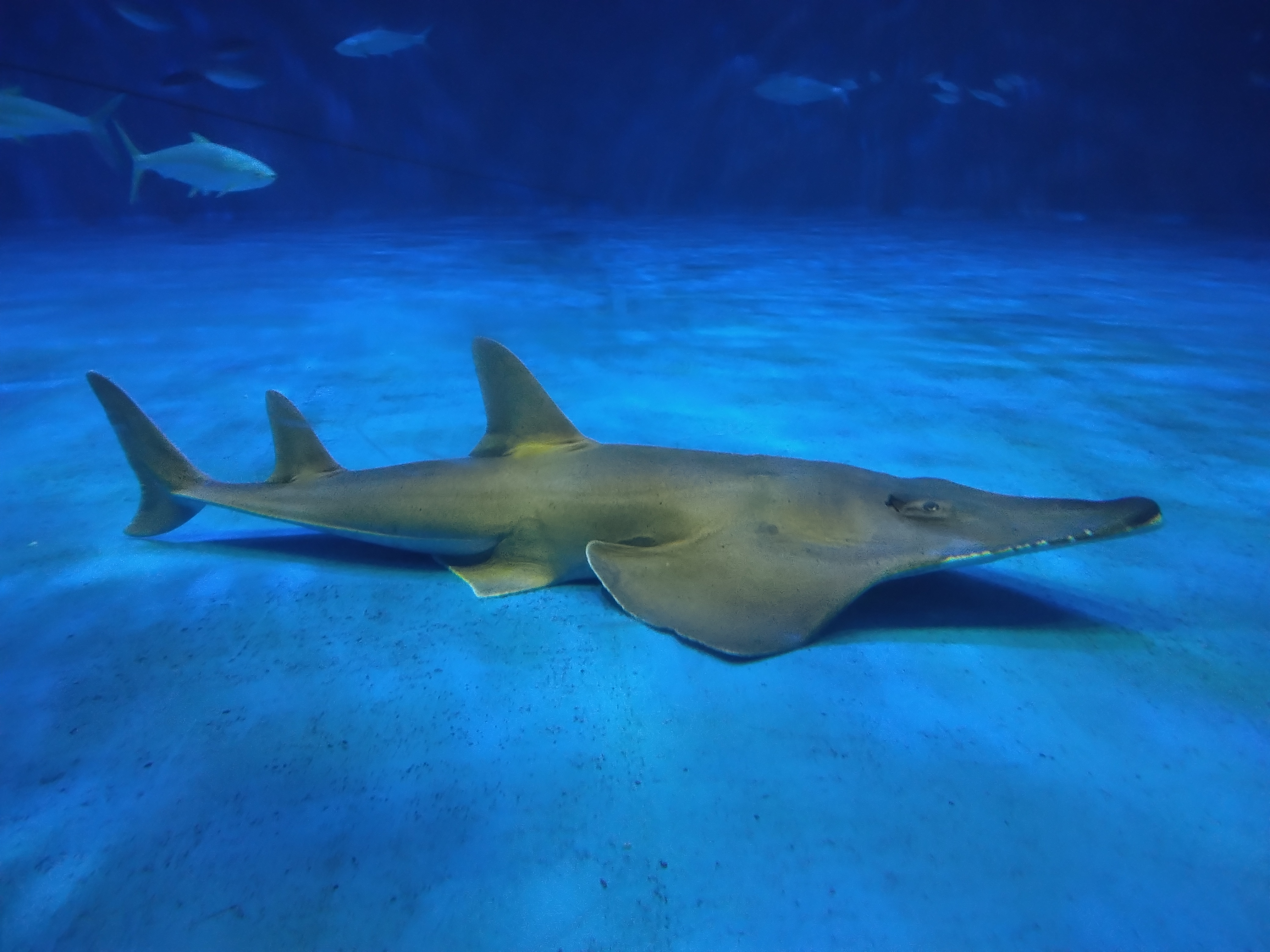
- At the Kagoshima Aquarium

Conservation status
- CITES Appendix II (CITES)

Scientific classification
- Domain: Eukaryota
- Kingdom: Animalia
- Phylum: Chordata
- Class: Chondrichthyes
- Subclass: Elasmobranchii
- Order: Rhinopristiformes
- Family: Rhinidae
- Genus: Rhynchobatus
- Species: R. mononoke

Binomial name
- Rhynchobatus mononoke Koeda, Itou, Yamada & Motomura, 2020

= Rhynchobatus mononoke =

Species of cartilaginous fish

Rhynchobatus mononoke, the Japanese wedgefish, is a species of fish in the family Rhinidae. It is found in southern Japan.

This species reaches a length of 130 cm (51 in).
