= False shark ray =

Conservation status
- Critically Endangered (IUCN 3.1)
- CITES Appendix II

Scientific classification
- Kingdom: Animalia
- Phylum: Chordata
- Class: Chondrichthyes
- Subclass: Elasmobranchii
- Order: Rhinopristiformes
- Family: Rhinidae
- Genus: Rhynchorhina; Séret & Naylor, 2016
- Species: R. mauritaniensis

Binomial name
- Rhynchorhina mauritaniensis Séret & Naylor, 2016

Species of cartilaginous fish

The false shark ray (Rhynchorhina mauritaniensis) is a species of fish in the Rhinidae family and the only species in the genus Rhynchorhina. This rare ray is only known from shallow coastal Atlantic waters in Banc d’Arguin, Mauritania.

The upperparts of the false shark ray are greyish or greenish-brown and densely covered in white spots. The largest known reliably measured specimen was 2.24 m (7.3 ft) long, but individuals about 2.75 m (9 ft) have been seen. Overall it resembles the African wedgefish (Rhynchobatus luebberti) found in the same region, but it has a blunt rounded snout somewhat like the shark ray or bowmouth guitarfish (Rhina ancylostoma) of the Indo-Pacific. The genus name Rhynchorhina (Rhyncho+rhina) is a reference to this "mix" of features.

Although long known by the local Imraguen people, the first record confirmed by scientists was in 1998 and it only received its species description in 2016.

Very little is known about the behavior of the false shark ray, but a 2-metre (6.6 ft) female caught in February had ripe ovocytes and shrimp in the stomach, while another had moray eels in the stomach.
