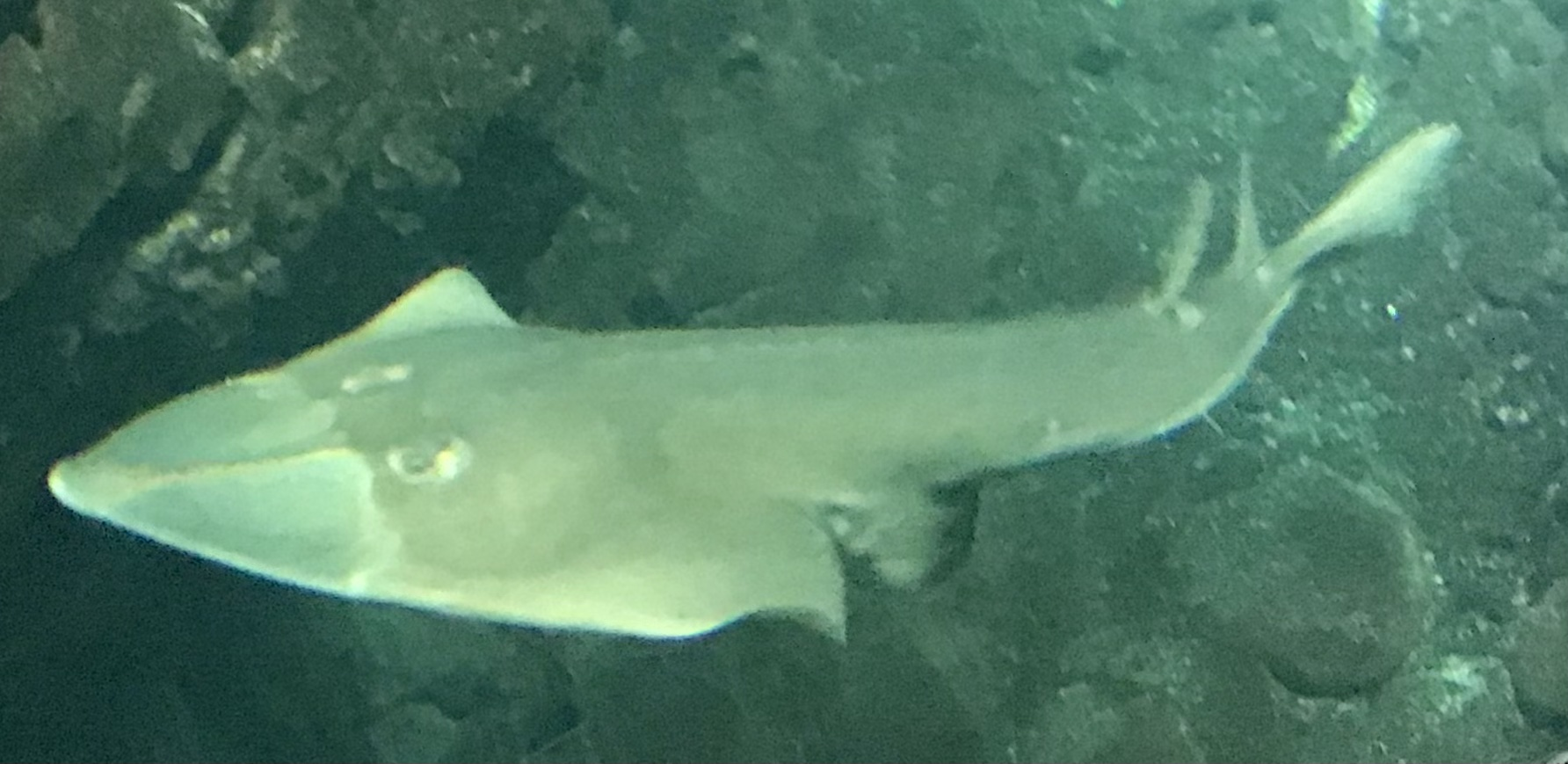
- Living specimen in Kuwait

Conservation status
- Critically Endangered (IUCN 3.1)
- CITES Appendix II

Scientific classification
- Kingdom: Animalia
- Phylum: Chordata
- Class: Chondrichthyes
- Subclass: Elasmobranchii
- Order: Rhinopristiformes
- Family: Glaucostegidae
- Genus: Glaucostegus
- Species: G. granulatus

Binomial name
- Glaucostegus granulatus (Cuvier, 1829)

Synonyms
- Rhinobatos granulatus Cuvier, 1829

= Sharpnose guitarfish =

Species of cartilaginous fish

The sharpnose guitarfish also known as the granulated guitarfish (Glaucostegus granulatus) is a species of ray in the Glaucostegidae family. They belong to the subclass Elasmobranchii which are cartilaginous fish that include sharks, rays, and skates as shown in their morphology. They have a flattened ray-like body and shark-like elongated snout. This species was first described by Georges Cuvier in 1829, and despite their appearance, they don't pose any threat to humans. As of April 2022, the IUCN has classified the sharpnose guitarfish as critically endangered.

== Distribution ==
The sharpnose guitarfish is endemic to the Indo-Pacific region. The populations are found near Australia, India, Indonesia, Kuwait, Myanmar, Pakistan, Papua New Guinea, the Philippines, Sri Lanka, Thailand, Vietnam, and possibly China and Oman. Its natural habitats are open seas, coral reefs, and estuarine waters. It ranges from intertidal to offshore continental shelves down to 119 m (390 ft). The sharpnose guitarfish feeds on large shellfish and other invertebrates. Due to the distribution across the Indo-Pacific, the sharpnose guitarfish have experienced environmental pressures based on their habitat degrading and overfishing.

== Description ==
The Glaucostegidae family are classified as rays that have a flattened body that is adapted for a benthic lifestyle. Glaucostegus granulatus is a large ray species that can reach a total length of 2.3 metres (7 ft 7 in). Its body is flattened and wedge-shaped, with a long, narrow truck and a pointed snout with oblique nostrils. The dorsal surface of the body is yellowish to brownish or greyish and has rough skin in small denticles. The dorsal fins are closely together, with a spacing of 1.3 to 1.6 times the length of the base of the dorsal fin, and the tail length is roughly 1 to 1.4 times the disc length. The wedge disc has a long and narrow pointed tip snout with broad oblique nostrils and with narrow anterior opening. Mature males can be as long as 98 cm (39 in), although larger individuals that are up to 2.7 metres (8 ft 10 in) have been recorded. The skin has fine denticles, with a midline, small patches near the eye, on the shoulder, and sometimes snout that are generally more visible with younger guitarfish. The long snout and rough skin texture that has more of a granular dorsally can help to correctly identify sharpnose guitarfish from similar species in their family.

== Feeding ==
Sharpnose guitarfish are cartilaginous benthic organisms that consume crustaceans, mollusks, and benthic organisms that inhabit the sediment. They are well-suited for hunting on the seafloor even though visibility might be low, and prey might be under the sediment. There is little information surrounding sharpnose guitarfish feeding habits but like other rays, sharpnose guitarfish have electroreceptive organs known as the ampullae of Lorenzini on their snout. These organs can detect weak electric fields that are generated from the muscle movements of prey. Also, elasmobranchs possess a lateral line that can detect hydrodynamic movements to spot prey or evade potential predators. The flattened body and the long snout enable them to maneuver near the seafloor which maximizes their access to benthic creatures.

== Reproductive ==
Sharpnose guitarfish exhibit an ovoviviparous reproductive lifestyle which is the embryos are in the form of eggs that remain within the mother until they're ready to hatch. The internal fertilization strategy allows the female to incubate the embryos and provide nutrition from the yolk sack. Reproduction such as this is common for rays because it allows the young to be fully formed and not be suitable for predation during their larvae forms. Female sharpnose guitarfish can produce 6 to 10 offspring per litter. With low reproductive rates and long gestation periods, the sharpnose guitarfish is vulnerable to being overfished which results in population decline. This combination of slow growth rates and late sexual maturity means the population has a limited capacity for recovery once populations have started to decline.

== Conservation status ==
The sharpnose guitarfish is classified as a critically endangered species. The rhinopristoid rays (sawfishes, wedgefises, giant guitarfishes, and guitarfishes) have experienced a severe reduction in their populations-based overfishing, particularly as incidental catch. As a result of exploitation, the sharpnose guitarfish populations are facing drastic declines and some localized populations are disappearing entirely. One of the primary threats to sharpnose guitarfish is overfishing and incidental catch by commercial fishermen. Unintentionally trawls, nets, and other forms of industrial fishing gear have caused the sharpnose population to not recover quickly from these fishing pressures. They had demand for their fins in the international markets. The finning practice where sharks and rays are solely captured for their fins remains a challenge for conservation strategies even though there are regulations banning these practices in many countries. Also, unintentional catches pose a serious threat for sharpnose guitarfish. They aren't the target fishes for fisheries but because they are not returned to the water alive, their populations decline. Having a correct assessment of the number of sharpnose guitarfish can be difficult since there is a lack of species-specific time series data that is available to view the reductions for the sharpnose guitarfish. Assessing the true population of sharpnose guitar fish is challenging due to the lack of species-specific time-series and incorrect taxonomic identification. So, the true extent of the population decline is difficult to calculate. However, the mitochondrial genome and partial nuclear genome of the sharpnose guitarfish have been successfully sequenced which provides more detail about the phylogenetic assessment of this species. The genetic data is expected to enhance the species-specific population and help assessments for effective conservation efforts.
