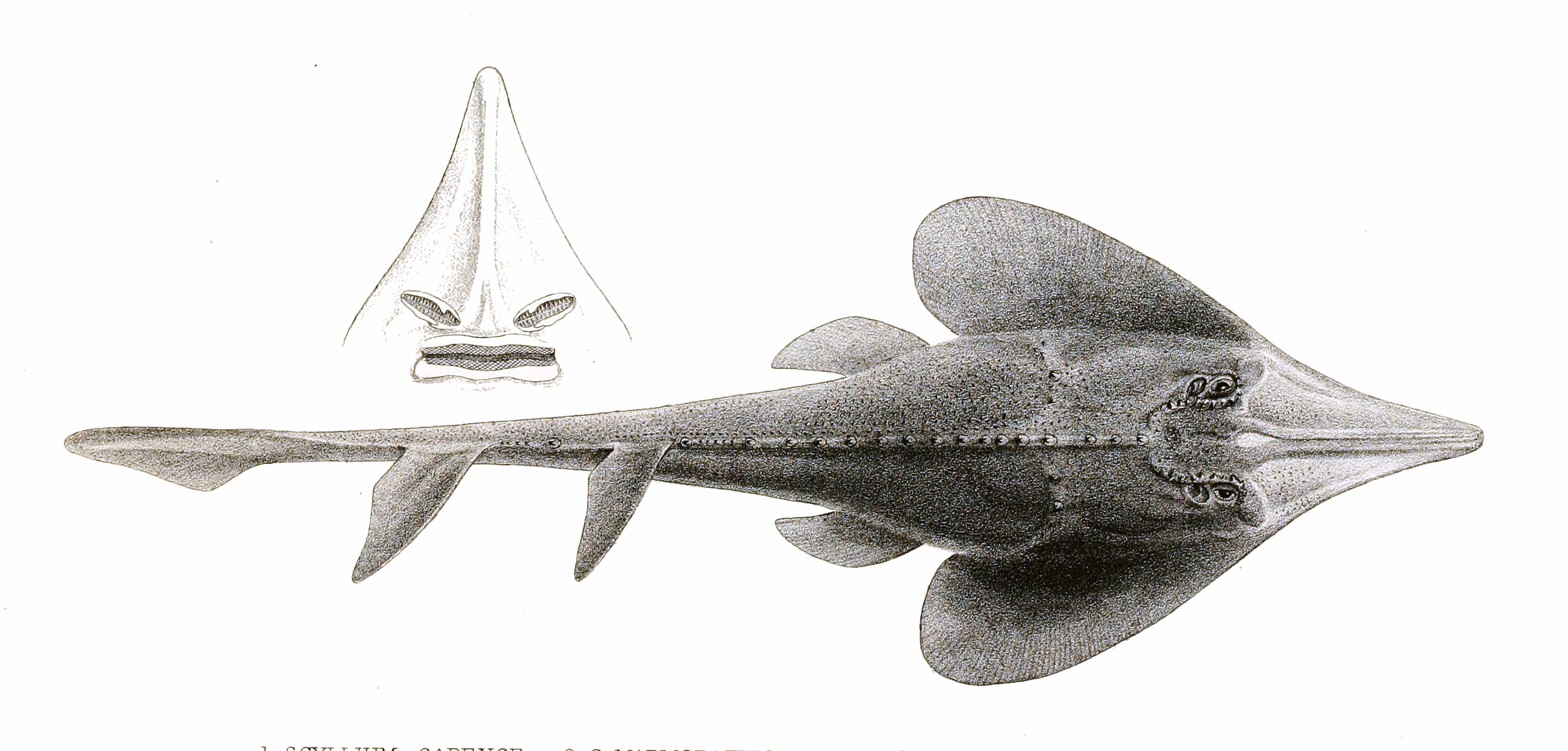

Conservation status
- Critically Endangered (IUCN 3.1)
- CITES Appendix II

Scientific classification
- Kingdom: Animalia
- Phylum: Chordata
- Class: Chondrichthyes
- Subclass: Elasmobranchii
- Order: Rhinopristiformes
- Family: Glaucostegidae
- Genus: Glaucostegus
- Species: G. thouin

Binomial name
- Glaucostegus thouin (Anonymous, referred to Lacépède, 1798)

Synonyms
- Raja thouin Anonymous [Lacepède], 1798; Rhinobatos thouin (Anonymous [Lacepède], 1798)

= Clubnose guitarfish =

Species of cartilaginous fish

The clubnose guitarfish (Glaucostegus thouin) is a critically endangered species of ray in the Glaucostegidae family. It is found from shallow coastal waters to a depth of 60 m (200 ft) in the Indo-Pacific, ranging from India to Southeast Asia, and also in the Red Sea. There are also old unconfirmed records from the Mediterranean and Suriname.

It reaches up to 3 m (9.8 ft) in length, but typically is less than 2.5 m (8.2 ft).It is pale yellowish or brownish with a pale snout. It has an unusual club-like tip of the snout, which separates it from other members of the genus Glaucostegus.
