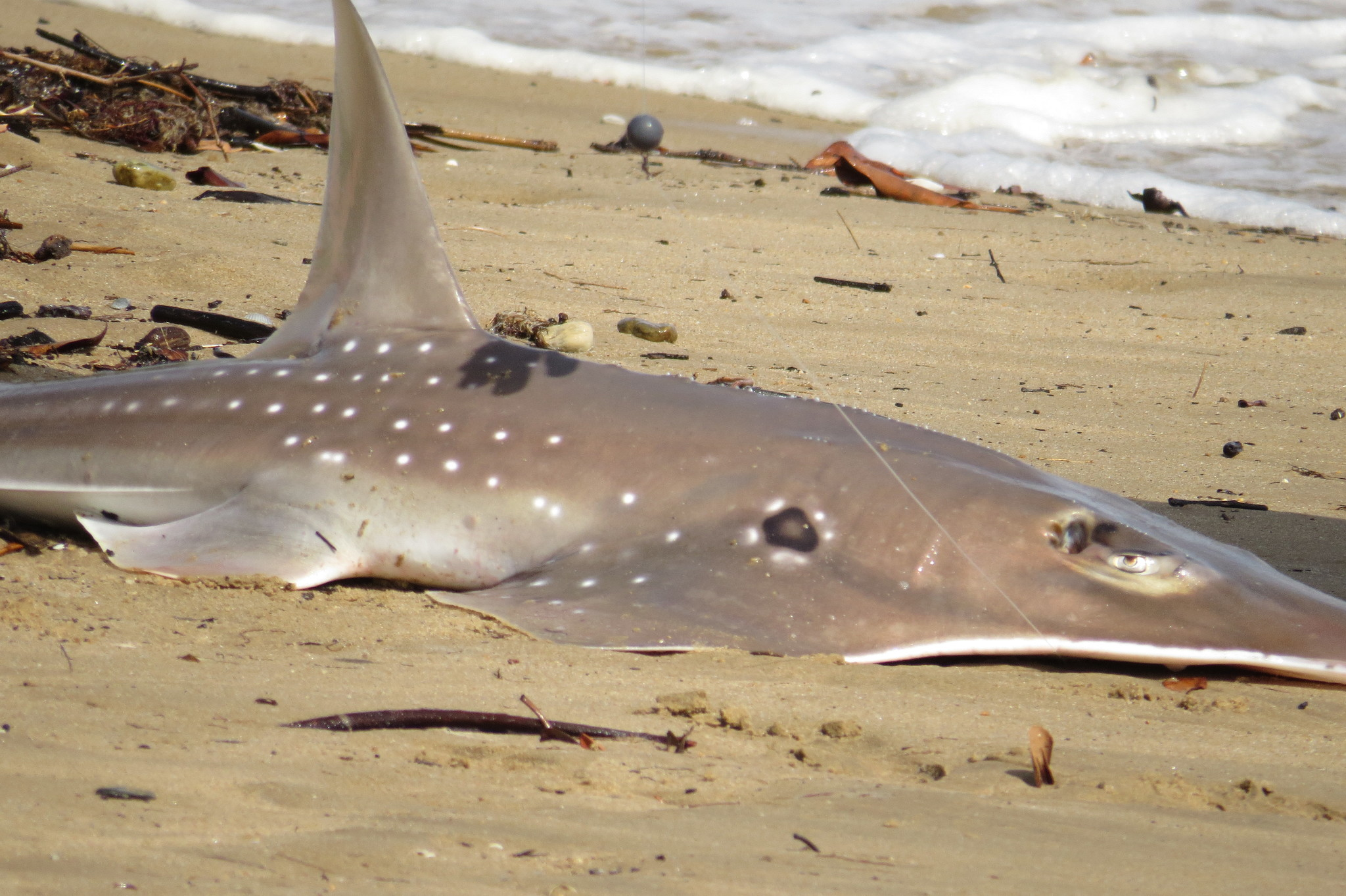

Conservation status
- CITES Appendix II

Scientific classification
- Kingdom: Animalia
- Phylum: Chordata
- Class: Chondrichthyes
- Subclass: Elasmobranchii
- Order: Rhinopristiformes
- Family: Rhinidae
- Genus: Rhynchobatus
- Species: R. palpebratus

Binomial name
- Rhynchobatus palpebratus Compagno & Last, 2008

= Rhynchobatus palpebratus =

Species of cartilaginous fish

Rhynchobatus palpebratus, the eyebrow wedgefish, is a species of fish in the family Rhinidae. It is found in coastal waters off northern Australia. It reaches up to 2.62 m (8.6 ft) in length and closely resembles the smoothnose wedgefish (R. laevis), which has denser white spotting, and also differs in distribution and genetics.
