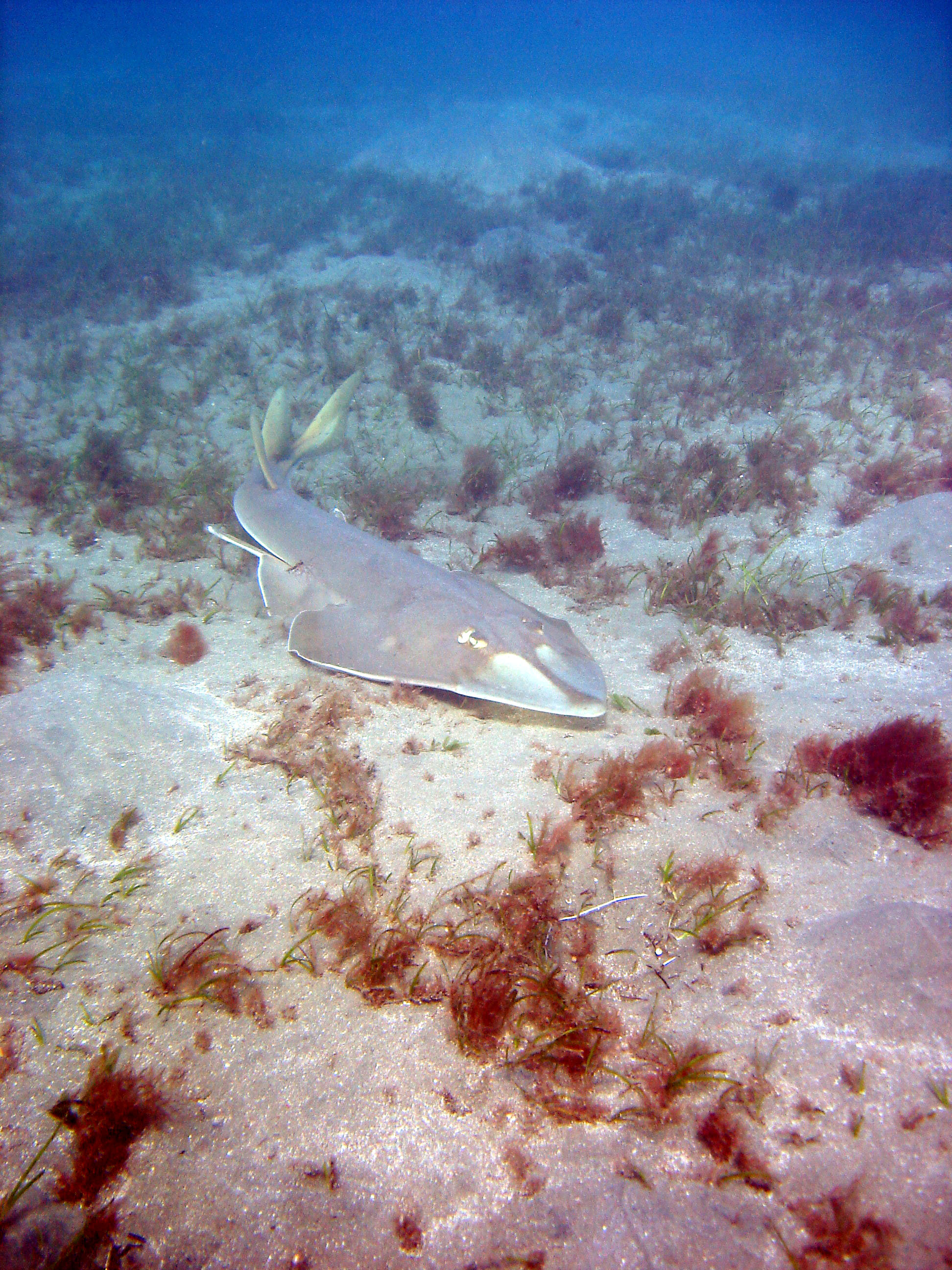

Conservation status
- Critically Endangered (IUCN 3.1)
- CITES Appendix II

Scientific classification
- Kingdom: Animalia
- Phylum: Chordata
- Class: Chondrichthyes
- Subclass: Elasmobranchii
- Order: Rhinopristiformes
- Family: Glaucostegidae
- Genus: Glaucostegus
- Species: G. halavi

Binomial name
- Glaucostegus halavi (Forsskål, 1775)

Synonyms
- Rhinobatus halavi (Forsskål, 1775); Raja halavi Forsskål, 1775

= Halavi guitarfish =

Species of cartilaginous fish

The halavi guitarfish (Glaucostegus halavi) is a critically endangered species of ray in the Glaucostegidae family. It is found in the Indo-West Pacific (Red Sea to Gulf of Oman, with unconfirmed records in the area east of Oman). It has only been recorded twice, in 1997 and 2004, in the levantine waters, the question of its permanent settlement in the Mediterranean Sea remains open. Its name is derived from the Arabic word حلاوي (halawi).

Halavi guitarfish are usually large with a short, wide snout with a rounded tip. They are typically a yellow/gray color, which helps them blend in on the sea floor. Averagely, they are born at around 29 cm, but can grow to be 171 cm.

They commonly prey on small molluscs and bony fish.
