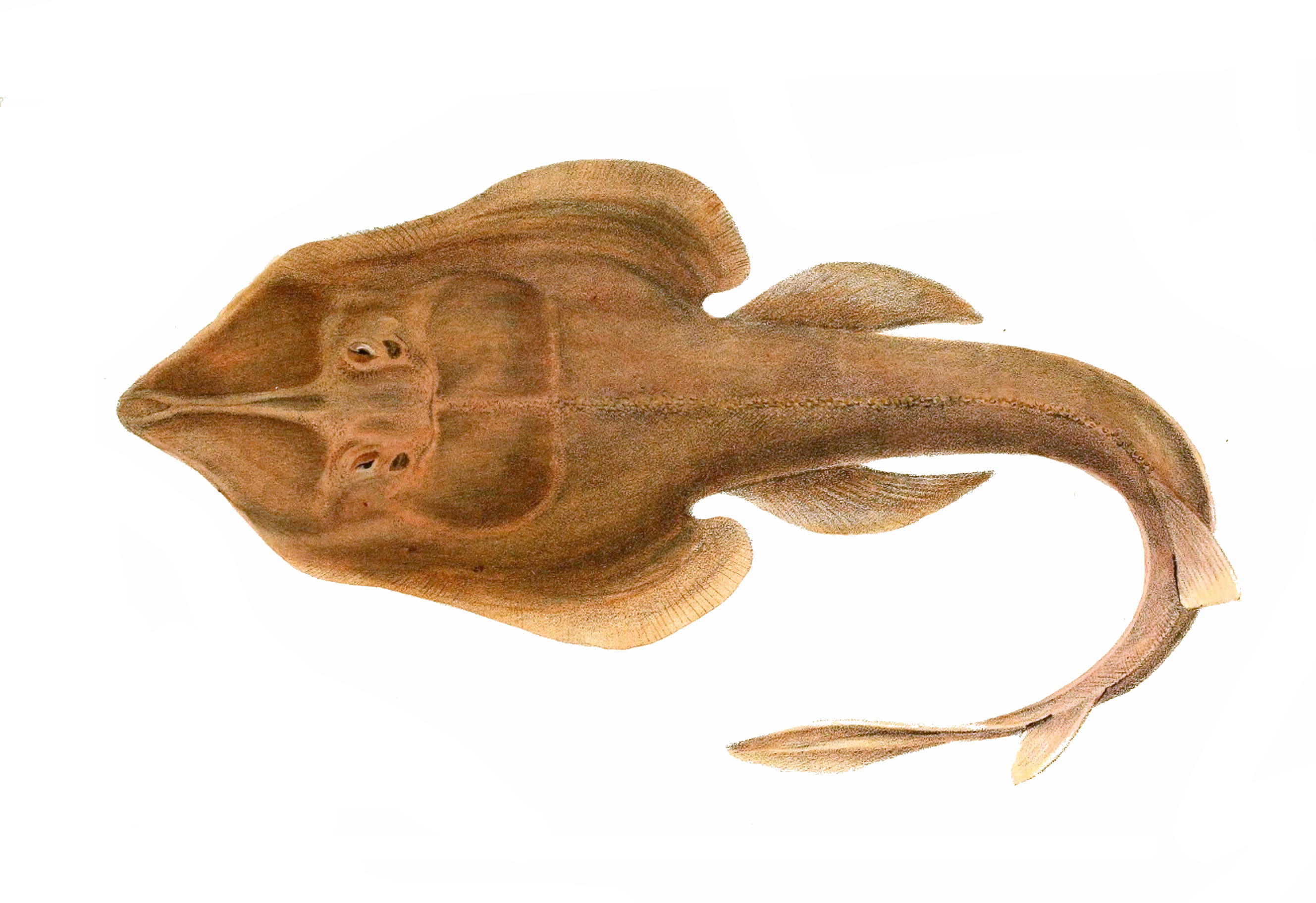

Conservation status
- Critically Endangered (IUCN 3.1)
- CITES Appendix II

Scientific classification
- Kingdom: Animalia
- Phylum: Chordata
- Class: Chondrichthyes
- Subclass: Elasmobranchii
- Order: Rhinopristiformes
- Family: Glaucostegidae
- Genus: Glaucostegus
- Species: G. obtusus

Binomial name
- Glaucostegus obtusus (J. P. Müller & Henle, 1841)

Synonyms
- Rhinobatos obtusus

= Widenose guitarfish =

Species of cartilaginous fish

The widenose guitarfish (Glaucostegus obtusus) is a species of ray in the Glaucostegidae family. They are a part of the subclass Elasmobranchii, along with other cartilaginous fish such as sharks, rays and skates. Their name comes from their distinctively broader and blunter snout, followed by a long, slender, and tapering body which resembles a guitar. Despite their close relation to sharks and stingrays, they pose no threat to humans. After an assessment in December 2018, the IUCN has classified the Widenose Guitarfish as critically endangered.

== Distribution ==
This species is endemic to the northern Indian Ocean with populations found in India, Bangladesh, Pakistan, Iran, Sri Lanka, Malaysia, Indonesia, Myanmar, Thailand, and possibly the Persian Gulf. In India, it is found along the western and eastern coasts from states such as Maharashtra, Karnataka, Goa, Kerala, Tamil Nadu, Odisha and West Bengal. Sightings are also common in certain major cities such as Mumbai, Kochi and Chennai. Its frequented habitats include shallow, inshore waters, coral reefs, estuaries and open seas. As a benthic species, it prefers sandy or muddy substrates present in intertidal regions to continental shelves with depths up to 60m (196.8 ft). Despite being a generally uncommon species, they can be abundant in localized populations, given suitable habitat.
