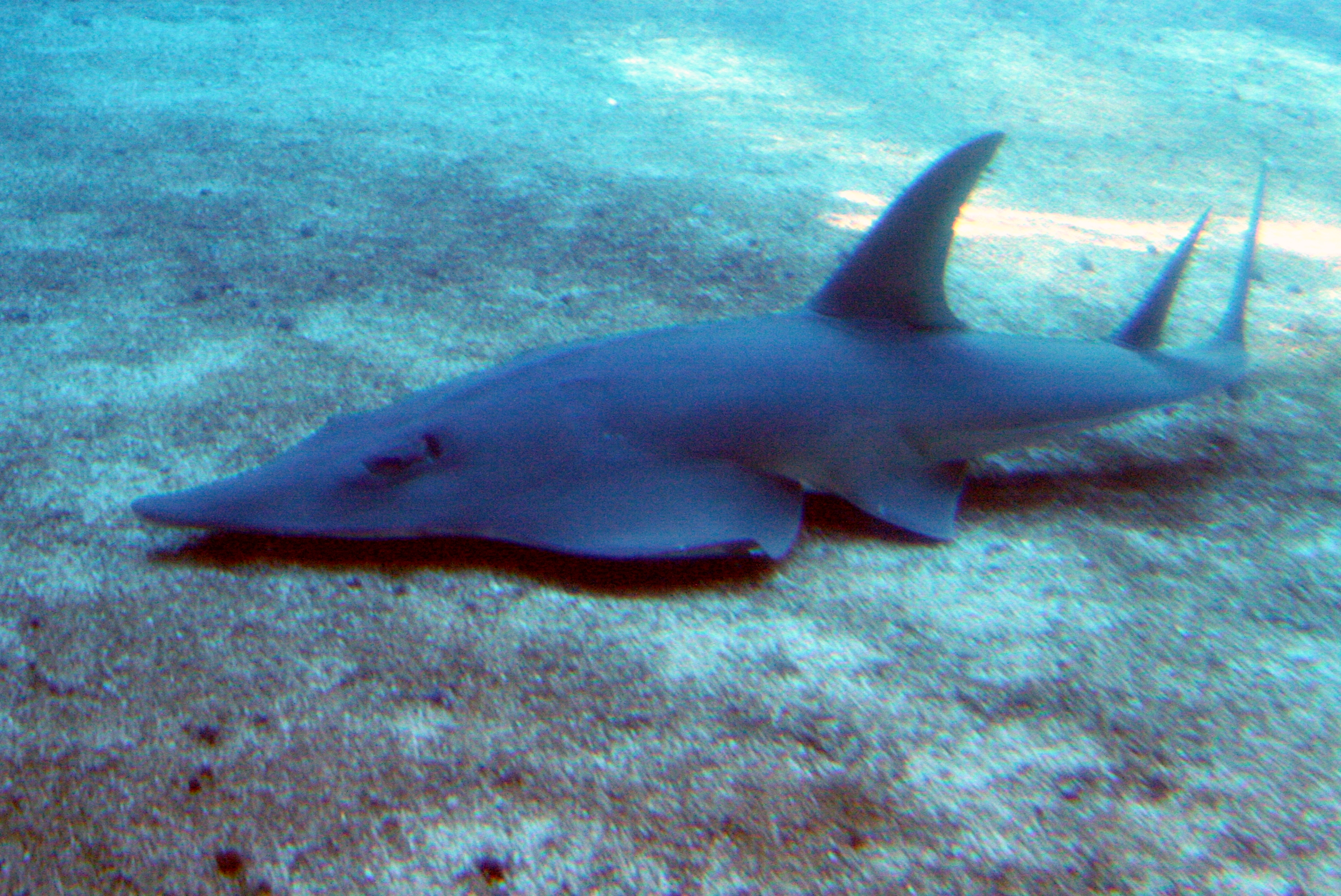
- Giant guitarfish (R. djiddensis)

Scientific classification
- Kingdom: Animalia
- Phylum: Chordata
- Class: Chondrichthyes
- Subclass: Elasmobranchii
- Order: Rhinopristiformes
- Family: Rhinidae
- Genus: Rhynchobatus; J. P. Müller & Henle, 1837

Type species
- Rhinobatus laevis Bloch & J. G. Schneider, 1801

= Rhynchobatus =

Rhynchobatus Temporal range: Lower Eocene–Recent

Genus of cartilaginous fishes

Rhynchobatus (from Ancient Greek ῥύγχος (rhúnkos), meaning "snout", and βάτος (bátos), meaning "ray") is a genus of rays commonly known as wedgefishes in the family Rhinidae. They are found in the tropical and subtropical Indo-Pacific with a single species (R. luebberti) in the eastern Atlantic. All species in this genus (excluding R. palpebratus) are assessed as Critically Endangered by IUCN.

The species are superficially similar and have often been confused. The various species can generally be separated by a combination of snout shape, vertebral count and exact colour (distribution of white spots, and presence/absence of a black spot at the base of the pectoral fin). The largest species can reach about 3 m (10 ft) and are among the largest species of Rhinopristiformes, but the smallest reach less than one-third of that size.

== Species ==
There are currently seven recognized species in this genus: In the past all the Indo-Pacific species have been confused with R. djiddensis, which as presently defined is restricted to the western Indian Ocean.

- Rhynchobatus australiae Whitley, 1939 (white-spotted wedgefish)
- Rhynchobatus djiddensis (Forsskål, 1775) (giant guitarfish)
- Rhynchobatus cooki Last, Kyne & Compagno, 2016 (roughnose wedgefish)
- Rhynchobatus immaculatus Last, H. C. Ho & R. R. Chen, 2013 (Taiwanese wedgefish)
- Rhynchobatus laevis (Bloch & J. G. Schneider, 1801) (smoothnose wedgefish)
- Rhynchobatus luebberti Ehrenbaum, 1915 (African wedgefish)
- Rhynchobatus mononoke Koeda, Itou, Yamada & Motomura, 2020 (Japanese wedgefish)
- Rhynchobatus palpebratus Compagno & Last, 2008 (eyebrow wedgefish)
- Rhynchobatus springeri Compagno & Last, 2010 (broadnose wedgefish)
