= Ataktobatis =

Ataktobatis Temporal range: Maastrichtian

Scientific classification
- Kingdom: Animalia
- Phylum: Chordata
- Class: Chondrichthyes
- Subclass: Elasmobranchii
- Order: Rhinopristiformes
- Genus: †Ataktobatis; Cappetta & Corral, 1999

Extinct Rhinopristiform genus

Ataktobatis is an extinct genus of rhinopristiform fish from the Late Cretaceous. It is currently known from a singular species, A. variabilis. It was described from the Maastrichtian of the Basque country and is known from rocks of the same age in Egypt and Morocco. It has yet to be ascribed to a family.
