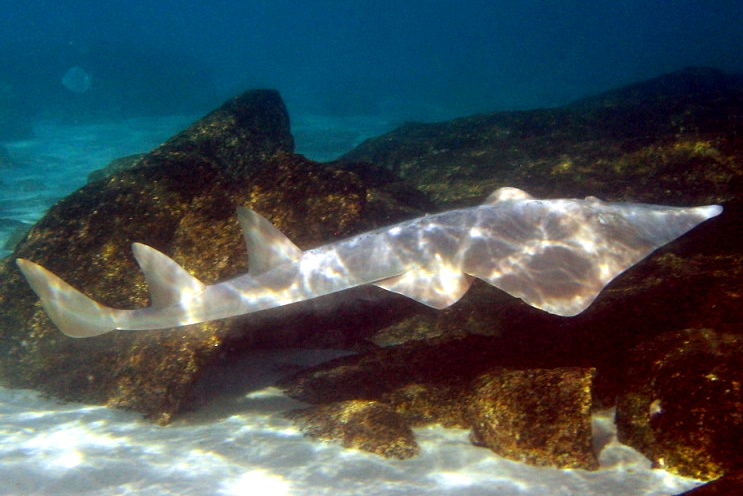

Conservation status
- Critically Endangered (IUCN 3.1)
- CITES Appendix II

Scientific classification
- Kingdom: Animalia
- Phylum: Chordata
- Class: Chondrichthyes
- Subclass: Elasmobranchii
- Order: Rhinopristiformes
- Family: Glaucostegidae
- Genus: Glaucostegus
- Species: G. typus

Binomial name
- Glaucostegus typus (Anonymous, referred to E. T. Bennett, 1830)

Synonyms
- Glaucostegus microphthalmus (Teng, 1959); Rhinobatos typus Anonymous [Bennett], 1830

= Common shovelnose ray =

Species of fish

The common shovelnose ray, giant shovelnose ray or giant guitarfish (Glaucostegus typus) is a species of fish in the Rhinobatidae family found in the central Indo-Pacific, ranging from India to the East China Sea, Solomon Islands and northern Australia. It is found in shallow coastal areas to a depth of at least 100 m (330 ft), including mangrove, estuaries and reportedly also in freshwaters. It reaches up to 2.7 m (8.9 ft) in length, and is greyish-brown to yellowish-brown above with a paler snout.

This species has been tested for colour vision using choice experiments that control for brightness. It was the first rigorous behavioural evidence for colour vision in any elasmobranch.
