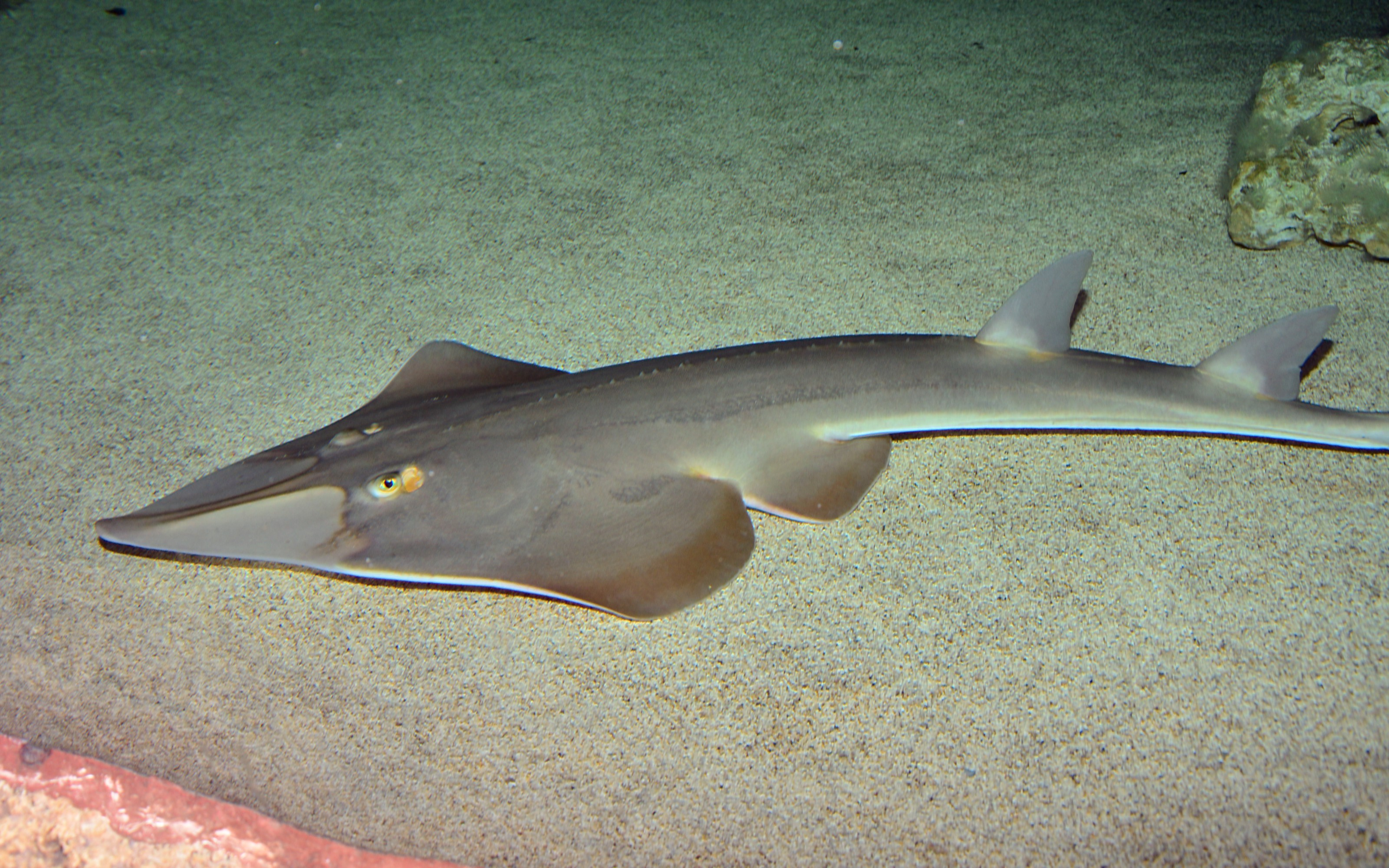

Conservation status
- Critically Endangered (IUCN 3.1)

Scientific classification
- Kingdom: Animalia
- Phylum: Chordata
- Class: Chondrichthyes
- Subclass: Elasmobranchii
- Order: Rhinopristiformes
- Family: Rhinobatidae
- Genus: Rhinobatos
- Species: R. rhinobatos

Binomial name
- Rhinobatos rhinobatos Linnaeus, 1758

Synonyms
- Leiobatus panduratus Rafinesque, 1810; Raia columnae Blainville, 1816; Raja rhinobatos Linnaeus, 1758; Rhinobatus columnae Bonaparte, 1836; Rhinobatus duhameli Blainville, 1825; Rhinobatus rhinobatus (Linnaeus, 1758); Squatinoraja colonna Nardo, 1824

= Common guitarfish =

Species of cartilaginous fish

The common guitarfish (Rhinobatos rhinobatos) is a species of cartilaginous fish in the family Rhinobatidae. It is native to the eastern Atlantic Ocean and the Mediterranean Sea. It is a bottom-dwelling fish feeding on crustaceans, other invertebrates and fish. The females give birth to live young. Its lifestyle makes it vulnerable to trawling and other fishing methods, populations seem to be declining, despite its name, and it has disappeared from parts of its range.

== Description ==
The common guitarfish can grow to about 147 cm (58 in), but a more normal length is about 80 cm (30 in). The dorsal surface is khaki-brown, and the underparts are white. It is very similar in appearance to the blackchin guitarfish (Glaucostegus cemiculus), which shares its distribution, but is generally smaller, has larger eyes, more widely separated rostral ridges, a longer front nasal lobe and a wider back nasal flap.

== Distribution ==
The common guitarfish is found in the North Atlantic Ocean from the Bay of Biscay to Angola and in the southern Mediterranean Sea. It cruises slowly just above the seabed, sometimes resting on the sand or mud and semi-covering itself with sediment.

== Ecology ==
The common guitarfish is a benthic fish, cruising just above the sandy or muddy seabed and foraging for crustaceans, other invertebrates and fish. It is an ovoviviparous fish with one or two litters of live young born yearly, each litter being four to ten fish. The gestation period is about four months, and the young develop inside the female, obtaining nourishment from their yolk sacs at first, and later from uterine secretions of their mother.

== Status ==
The common guitarfish lives close to the coast and breeds in shallow water. This makes it vulnerable, and it is fished, primarily as bycatch, over much of its range. In the northern Mediterranean, catches used to be landed, along with the blackchin guitarfish (Rhinobatos cemiculus), at fishing ports such as Palermo. Still, both fish are no longer seen there and have probably been extirpated from the area. It is no longer to be seen in the Balearic Islands either. Off the coasts of West Africa, it is caught as bycatch by international shrimp trawling vessels, by cephalopod fisheries trawling the seabed, and by local artisanal gill net fishermen. Its meat may be salted and exported, and its fins sold to Asia. It may be safest in the southern Mediterranean, where the fishing is less intensive and it is still sometimes landed, but even there, most of the fish landed are immature. For the fish to have a long-term future and the fisheries to be sustainable, the adult fish must be allowed to mature and breed. There is no special conservation plan for this fish, and the International Union for Conservation of Nature has assessed its conservation status as being "critically endangered".
