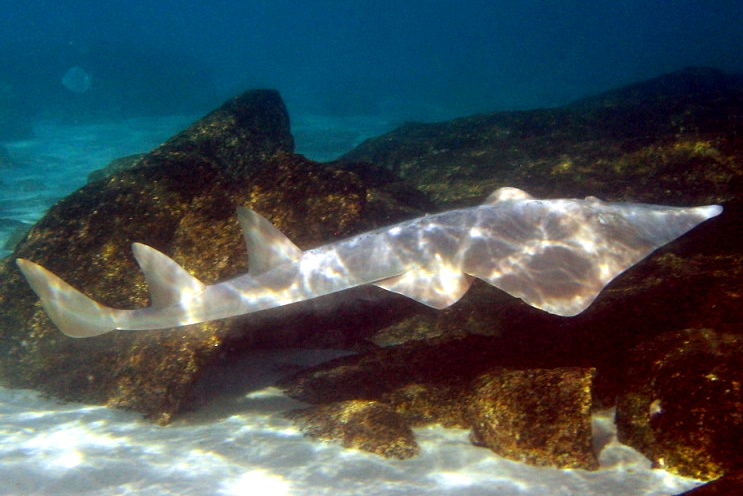
- Giant guitarfish (G. typus)

Scientific classification
- Kingdom: Animalia
- Phylum: Chordata
- Class: Chondrichthyes
- Subclass: Elasmobranchii
- Order: Rhinopristiformes
- Family: Glaucostegidae; Last, Séret & Naylor, 2016
- Genus: Glaucostegus; Bonaparte, 1846

= Glaucostegus =

Genus of cartilaginous fishes

Glaucostegus, also known as giant guitarfishes, is a genus of large Indo-Pacific rays, with a single species, Glaucostegus cemiculus, in the East Atlantic, and Mediterranean. They were formerly classified in the family Rhinobatidae but are now recognized as a distinct family, Glaucostegidae.

Their upperparts are uniform pale yellowish, brownish or greyish, and the nose is pale. Most are large, reaching 1.7–3 m (5.6–9.8 ft) in length depending on the exact species involved, except for the small G. obtusus that is less than 1 m (3.3 ft).

== Species ==
There are nine recognized species, all of which are classified as critically endangered:

- Glaucostegus cemiculus (Geoffroy St. Hilaire, 1817) (Blackchin guitarfish)
- Glaucostegus granulatus (Cuvier, 1829) (Sharpnose guitarfish)
- Glaucostegus halavi (Fabricius 1775) (Halavi guitarfish)
- Glaucostegus microphthalmus (Teng, 1959) (Smalleyed guitarfish)
- Glaucostegus obtusus (Müller & Henle, 1841) (Widenose guitarfish)
- Glaucostegus spinosus (Günther, 1870) (Spiny guitarfish)
- Glaucostegus thouin (Anonymous [Lacépède], 1798) (Clubnose guitarfish/Thouin ray)
- Glaucostegus typus (Anonymous [E. T. Bennett], 1830) (Giant guitarfish)
- Glaucostegus younholeei (Habib & Islam, 2021) (Bangladeshi guitarfish)
