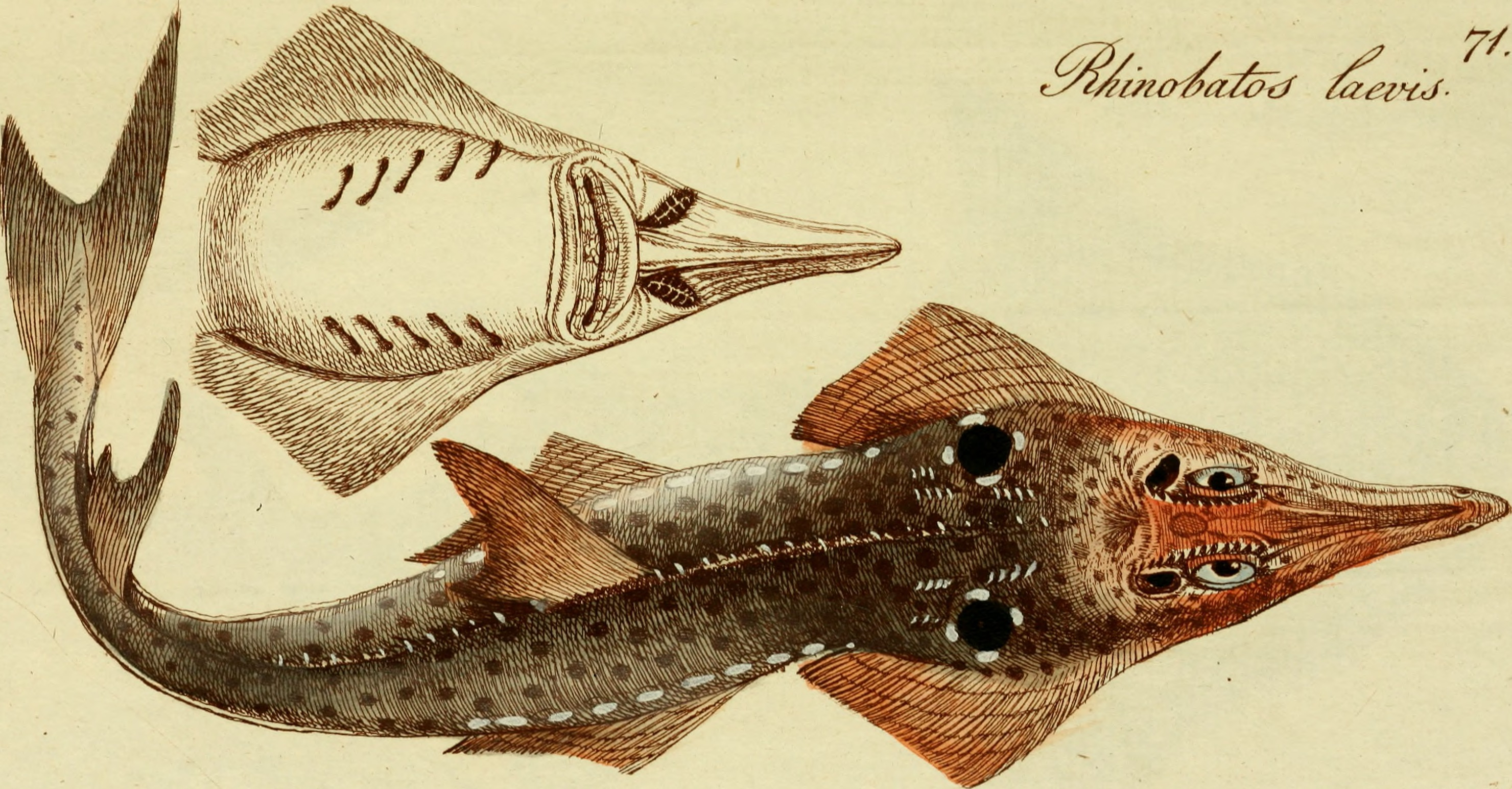

Conservation status
- Critically Endangered (IUCN 3.1)
- CITES Appendix II (CITES)

Scientific classification
- Kingdom: Animalia
- Phylum: Chordata
- Class: Chondrichthyes
- Subclass: Elasmobranchii
- Order: Rhinopristiformes
- Family: Rhinidae
- Genus: Rhynchobatus
- Species: R. laevis

Binomial name
- Rhynchobatus laevis (Bloch & J. G. Schneider, 1801)

= Smoothnose wedgefish =

Species of cartilaginous fish

The smoothnose wedgefish (Rhynchobatus laevis) is a species of fish in the Rhinidae family. It is found in northern Indian Ocean and northwestern Pacific Ocean, ranging from the Arabian Sea and Persian Gulf east to Bangladesh, and South China Sea to southern Japan. Populations elsewhere are now recognized as separate species. Its natural habitat is shallow coastal seas and off the mouths of rivers. It is threatened by habitat loss and overfishing.

Due to confusion with relatives it is poorly known, but it likely reaches at least 2 m (6.6 ft) in length. Its upperparts are greyish or brownish with 4–5 rows of white spots along each side; above each pectoral fin there is a dark spot surrounded by several smaller white spots. Except for its denser white spotting, it closely resembles the eyebrow wedgefish (R. palpebratus), but their ranges do not overlap.
