= Broadnose wedgefish =

Conservation status
- Critically Endangered (IUCN 3.1)
- CITES Appendix II

Scientific classification
- Kingdom: Animalia
- Phylum: Chordata
- Class: Chondrichthyes
- Subclass: Elasmobranchii
- Order: Rhinopristiformes
- Family: Rhinidae
- Genus: Rhynchobatus
- Species: R. springeri

Binomial name
- Rhynchobatus springeri Compagno & Last, 2010

Species of cartilaginous fish

The broadnose wedgefish (Rhynchobatus springeri) is a species of fish in the Rhinidae family. It is found in coastal and estuarine habitats in southeast Asia, where it is documented from Java, Borneo, Singapore, the Philippines and Thailand. It is threatened by habitat loss and overfishing. This is a medium-sized species of Rhynchobatus, which reaches a maximum length of about 2.15 m (7.1 ft).

== Etymology ==
The ray is named in honor of Stewart Springer (5 June 1906 – 23 August 1991), because of his contributions to the systematics of Rhynchobatus.
