= Ernst Ehrenbaum =

German biologist and oceanographer

Ernst M. E. Ehrenbaum (20 December 1861 – 6 March 1942) was a German biologist (especially fishes) and oceanographer.

== Biography ==
Ehrenbaum was born in Perleberg, Province of Brandenburg, Prussia. He studied natural sciences at the universities of Berlin, Würzburg and Kiel, receiving his degree at the latter institution in 1884. From 1888 to 1892 he was head of a wanderstation for German sea fishermen, and afterwards served as custodian for sea fishing at the Biological Institute Helgoland. From 1910 to 1931 he was director of the fish laboratory at the Museum of Natural History in Hamburg. He died in Marburg an der Lahn.

== Colleagues ==
Harry Macdonald Kyle (1872–1951), was a Scottish ichthyologist and fisheries scientist.

Erna Mohr (11 July 1894 – 10 September 1968) was a German zoologist who made contributions to ichthyology and mammalogy.

== Taxa ==
- Pellioditis ehrenbaumi, nematode species described by Ernst Bresslau and Jacobus Hermanus Schuurmans Stekhoven (1935).
- Pleistophora ehrenbaumi, microsporidean species described by Eduard Reichenow (1929).
- Rhabditis ehrenbaumi, nematode species described by Jacobus Hermanus Schuurmans Stekhoven (1935), synonymous with Rhabditis nidrosiensis.

== Published works ==
- Untersuchungen uber die struktur und bildung der schale der in der Kieler bucht hauftig vorkommenden muscheln, 1884 – Studies on the structure and formation of the shell of common mussels in Kiel Bay.
- Zur naturgeschichte von Crangon vulgaris Fabr., 1890 – On the natural history of Crangon vulgaris.
- Berichte über eine reise nach den wichtigsten fischereiplätzen der Vereinigten Staaten und über die fischereiabtheilung auf der Weltausstellung in Chicago im jahre 1893 (1894) – Reports on a journey to the most important fishing areas of the United States and on the fishery section at the World Exhibition in Chicago in 1893.
- Eier und larven von fischen der deutschen bucht, 1897 – Eggs and larvae of fish from German bays.
- Künstliche Zucht und Wachstum des Hummers, 1907 – Artificial breeding and the growth of lobsters.
- Seemuscheln als Nahrungsmittel, 1915 – Sea mussels as food.
- Die wichtigsten Seefische in Bildern, 1925 – Saltwater fish in pictures.
- Naturgeschichte und wirrtschaftliche Bedeutung der Seefische Nordeuropas, 1936 – Natural history and economic importance of marine fish in Northern Europe.

== See also ==
- Category:Taxa named by Ernst Ehrenbaum
