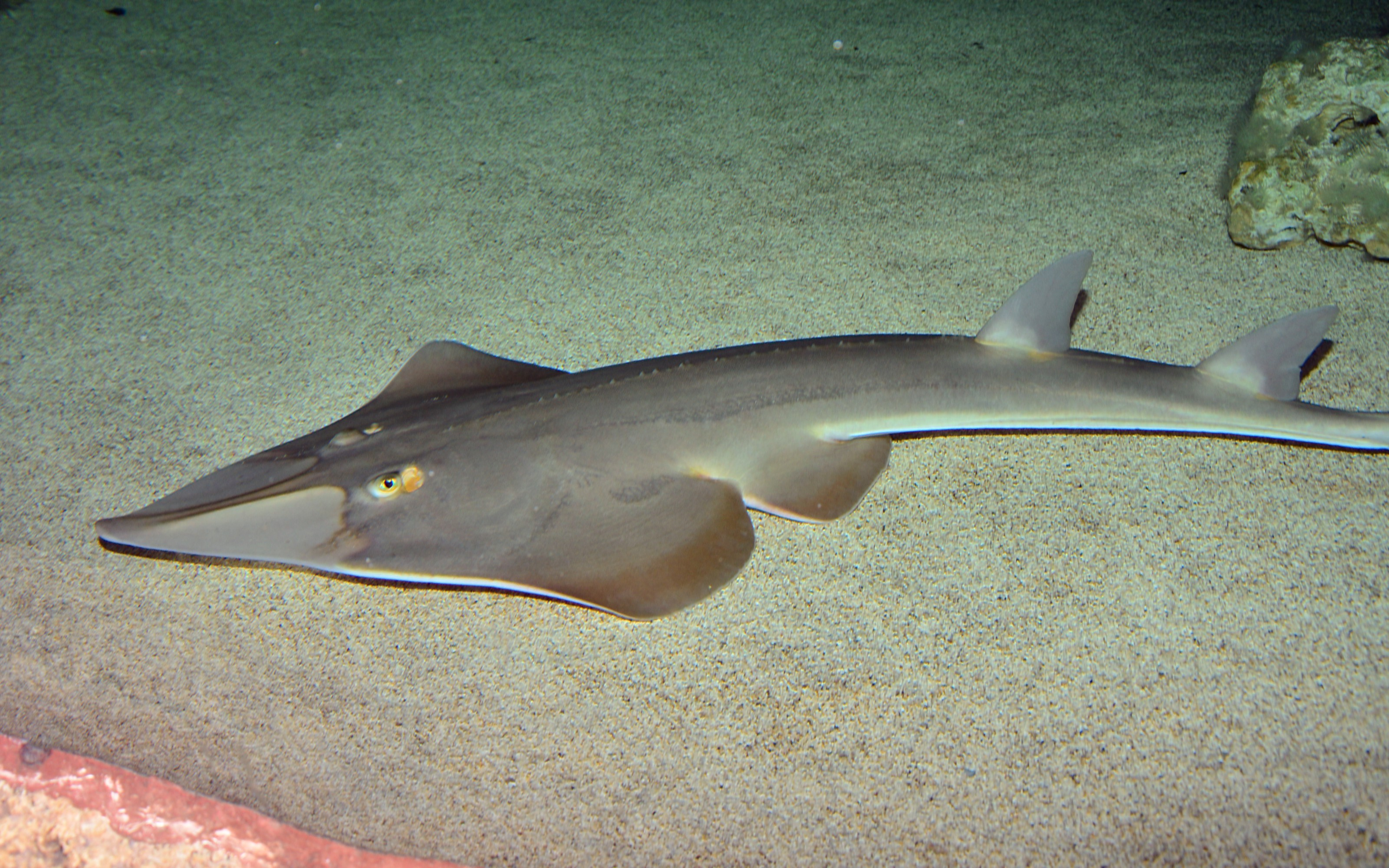
- Common guitarfish (Rhinobatos rhinobatos)

Scientific classification
- Kingdom: Animalia
- Phylum: Chordata
- Class: Chondrichthyes
- Subclass: Elasmobranchii
- Division: Batomorphi
- Order: Rhinopristiformes; Naylor, et al., 2012

Type species
- Pristis pristis (Linnaeus, 1758)

= Rhinopristiformes =

Order of cartilaginous fishes

Rhinopristiformes /raɪnoʊˈprɪstɪfɔːrmiːz/ (rhino rays) is an order of rays, cartilaginous fishes related to sharks, containing shovelnose rays and allied groups.

== Families ==
Rhinopristiformes contains the following families:

- Trygonorrhinidae Last, Séret & Naylor, 2016 (fiddler rays or banjo rays)
- Rhinobatidae Bonaparte, 1835 (guitarfishes)
- Rhinidae J. P. Müller & Henle, 1841 (bowmouth guitarfishes or wedgefishes)
- Glaucostegidae Last, Séret & Naylor, 2016 (giant guitarfishes)
- Pristidae Bonaparte, 1835 (sawfishes)

Two additional families are associated with the order but their phylogenetic relationships have not been fully resolved:

- Family Platyrhinidae (thornback rays)
- Family Zanobatidae (panrays)

The following fossil genera are also possibly rhinopristiforms, but phylogenetic relationships are uncertain:

- †Britobatos Claeson, Underwood & Ward, 2013 (Santonian of Lebanon, likely a stem-platyrhinid)
- †Stahlraja Brito, Leal & Gallo, 2013 (Albian of Brazil, likely a stem-trygonorrhinid)
- †Tethybatis Carvalho, 2004 (Campanian of Italy, likely a stem-trygonorrhinid)
- †Tingitanius Claeson, Underwood & Ward, 2013 (Turonian of Morocco, likely a platyrhinid)
- †Tlalocbatos Brito, Villalobos-Segura & Alvarado-Ortega, 2019 (Albian of Mexico, likely a stem-trygonorrhinid)

The Apolithabatiformes (spinorays), an extinct order of rays from the Late Jurassic of primarily Europe, convergently evolved a guitarfish-like body plan, but likely diverged prior to rhinopristiforms.

== Characteristics ==
Species in the order Rhinopristiformes generally exhibit slow growth, late maturity, and low fecundity. Alone or in combination, such features cause fishes in this group to be susceptible to extinction.

== Threats ==
Rhinopristiformes are more prone to being caught in many different types of fishing equipment, including trawl, gillnet, seine net, and hook-and-line.

They are caught for their meat but most importantly their fins. While the meat is mostly consumed locally the white fins are a delicacy and highly sought after. They are the most valuable part of Rhinopristiformes therefore their fins are in high demand. Both the combination of overfishing and the high desire for their fins has caused the Rhinopristiformes population to rapidly decline.
