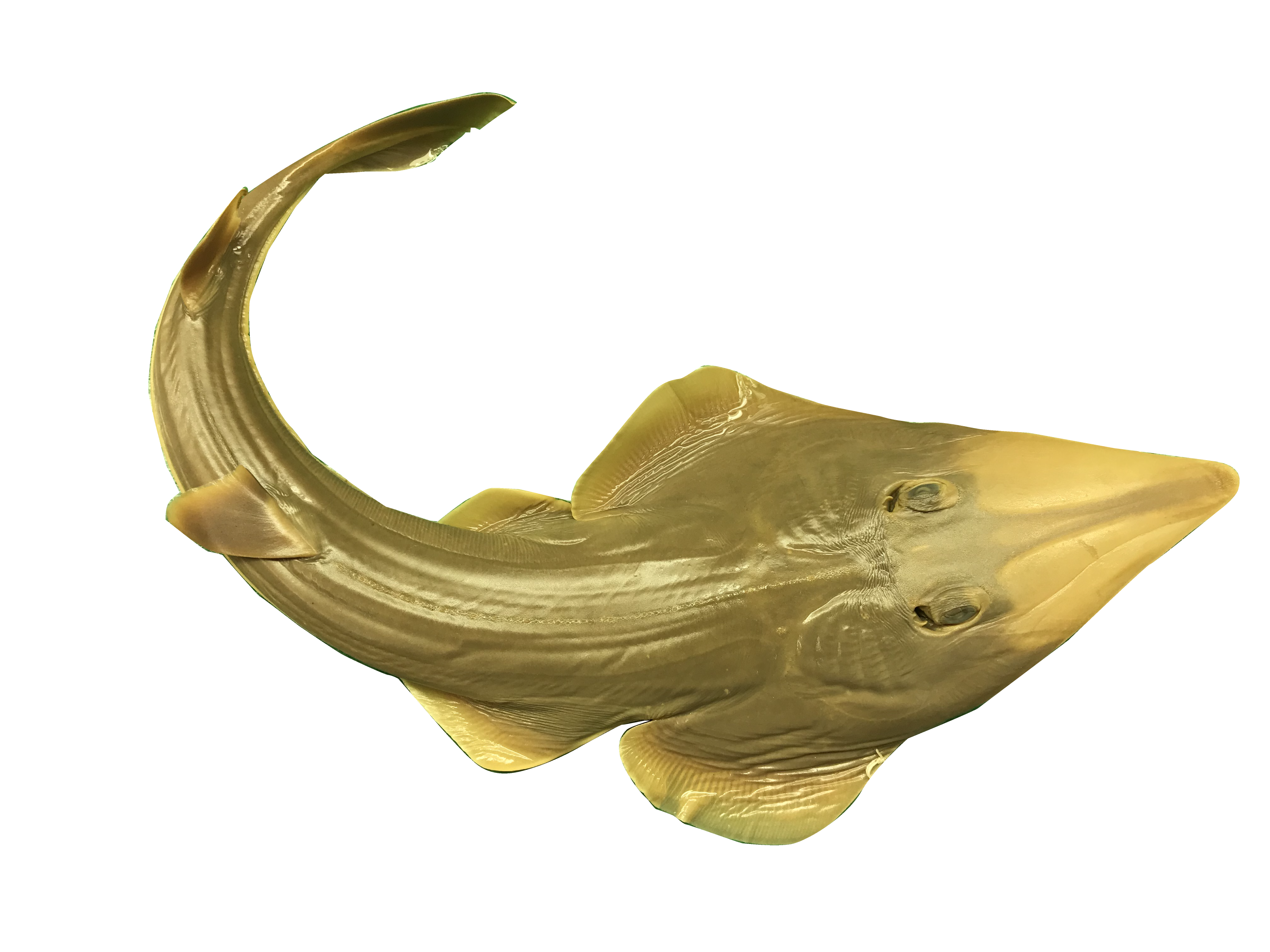
- P. buthi, the spadenose guitarfish

Conservation status
- Vulnerable (IUCN 3.1)

Scientific classification
- Kingdom: Animalia
- Phylum: Chordata
- Class: Chondrichthyes
- Subclass: Elasmobranchii
- Order: Rhinopristiformes
- Family: Rhinobatidae
- Genus: Pseudobatos
- Species: P. buthi

Binomial name
- Pseudobatos buthi K.M. Rutledge 2019

= Pseudobatos buthi =

Species of cartilaginous fish

Pseudobatos buthi, the spadenose guitarfish, is a ray in the family Rhinobatidae. Described in 2019 based on 82 museum specimens, little is known about this species in the wild. All 82 museum specimens were collected in the 1940s and 1950s and sat hidden at UCLA's fish collection and the Natural History Museum of Los Angeles County.

This guitarfish of the genus Pseudobatos discovered and by a graduate student studying in Ecology and evolutionary biology in the University of California Los Angeles, Kelsi Rutledge. The name Pseudobatos buthi is named after Don Buth, her mentor.

It likely is similar in ecology and behavior to its closest relative, Pseudobatos productus. This species is found in the Gulf of California and is a fairly small ray, with an intermediate body form between that of a shark and a ray. It is benthic, benthopelagic (Marine species that lives near the ocean bottom, float in the water column just above the sea floor, but does move in the water column above the seabed). The species spend most of its life on the seafloor in sandy, muddy, coastal regions above the benthic boundary layer. It is different from other species due to its morphological characters, including a more narrow head and snout, as well as no spots or scales and thorns between orbits and down its snout.

Members of the genus Psedusobatos are morphologically similar, and distinguishing among species can be challenging due to subtle differences. According to Last et al. (2016a), Pseudobatos species differ from other members of the family Rhinobatidae mainly in their nasal morphology. They are characterized by narrow, elongated posterior nasal openings, bilobed anterior nasal flaps, and broad posterolateral nasal flaps, along with several other small morphological traits, such as no spots or scales and thorns between orbits and down its snout.

Pseudobatos buthi is most morphologically similar to P. productus, but with a narrower snout, narrower disc width, a shorter distance from nostril to disc margin, and a narrower disc width at anterior orbit. Additional distinguishing characters include smaller nostril length, a shorter anterior nasal flap base, reduced posterior and posterolateral nasal flap width, and a shorter distance between the anterior nasal flaps.

Wide variation in some of the characteristics exist for P. buthi, for example, snout length can vary from 14 to 19% compared to P. productus that have 15-17%. Juvenile specimens of P. buthi are more readily distinguishable from adults, as juvenile P. buthi possess a long disc length at equivalent total lengths, a narrower snout tip, more pronounced interorbital scales, and denser thorns along the rostrum. In adults, these differences become less distinct.

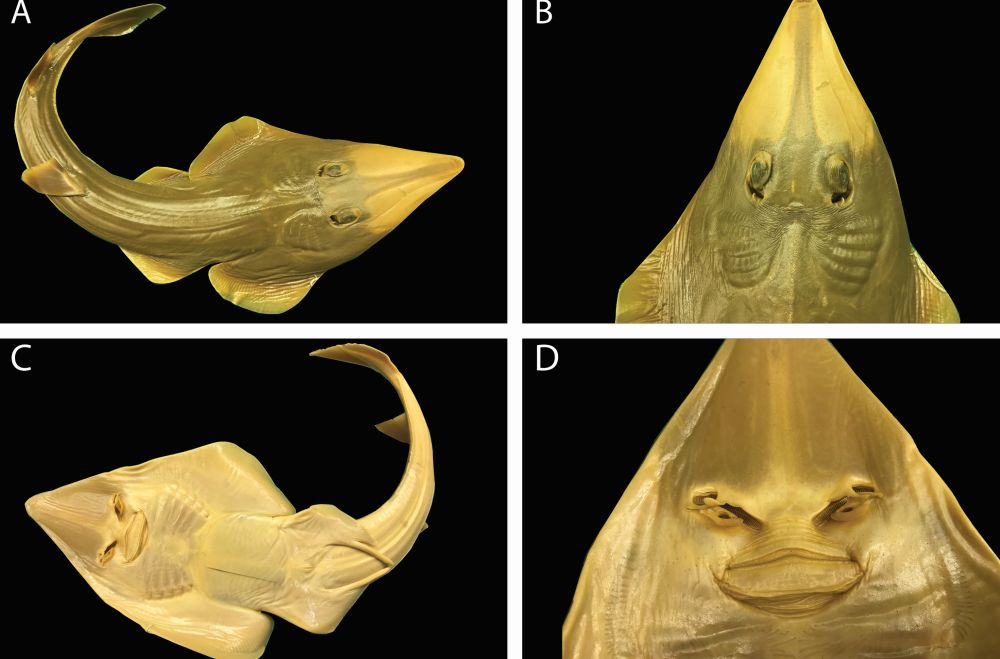
Pseudobatos buthi Rutledge, 2019; holotype, SIO 15-405 [formerly UCLA W50-189], 471.1 TL male © Kelsi M. Rutledge

Currently, it is unknown if P. buthi is still present in its origin of discovery, Gulf of California, as the last P. buthi recorded was caught in April 1961. However, due to its highly alike trait with P. productus, it is likely that P. buthi has been caught and misidentified as P. productus.

The maximum length recorded is 68.5 cm (27.0 in).

== Systematics ==
- Classification/Names:

- Class: Elasmobranchii (sharks & rays)
- Order: Rhinopristiformes (shovelnose rays)
- Family: Rhinobatidae (guitarfishes)
- Genus: Pseudobatos
- Species: Pseudobatos buthi

== Distribution ==
Marine species, found on shallow coastal regions of the Gulf of California to at least two metres (7 ft) depth. The map shows the distribution of P. buthi, a new species caught by Boyd Walker and his colleagues in the 1940s and 1950s.

== Biology ==
Although detailed biological data on P. buthi are limited, general characteristics can be inferred from closely related species in the genus Pseudobatos.

Diet:

Like other guitarfishes, P. buthi likely feeds on small crustaceans, benthic fishes, and polychaete worms. These prey items are common in shallow soft-sediment environments where the species is found.

Reproduction:

Guitarfishes are typically ovoviviparous, meaning embryos develop inside egg cases retained within the mother until live birth. Litters usually contain 4–15 pups, depending on species. Although reproductive biology has not been directly studied in P. buthi, it likely follows this pattern.

== Conservation Status ==
- IUCN Status: Vulnerable

Pseudobatos buthi has been formally assessed by the IUCN Red List.

- Population Status

No confirmed sightings have been recorded since 1961, but this is likely due to misidentification rather than extinction. Without modern survey effort or accurate field identification, true population trends cannot be evaluated.

This species garnered a lot of media attention due to the describer, Rutledge, who posted mock birth-announcement style photos with a preserved museum specimen, including Forbes, Spectrum1 News, Smithsonian Magazine.
