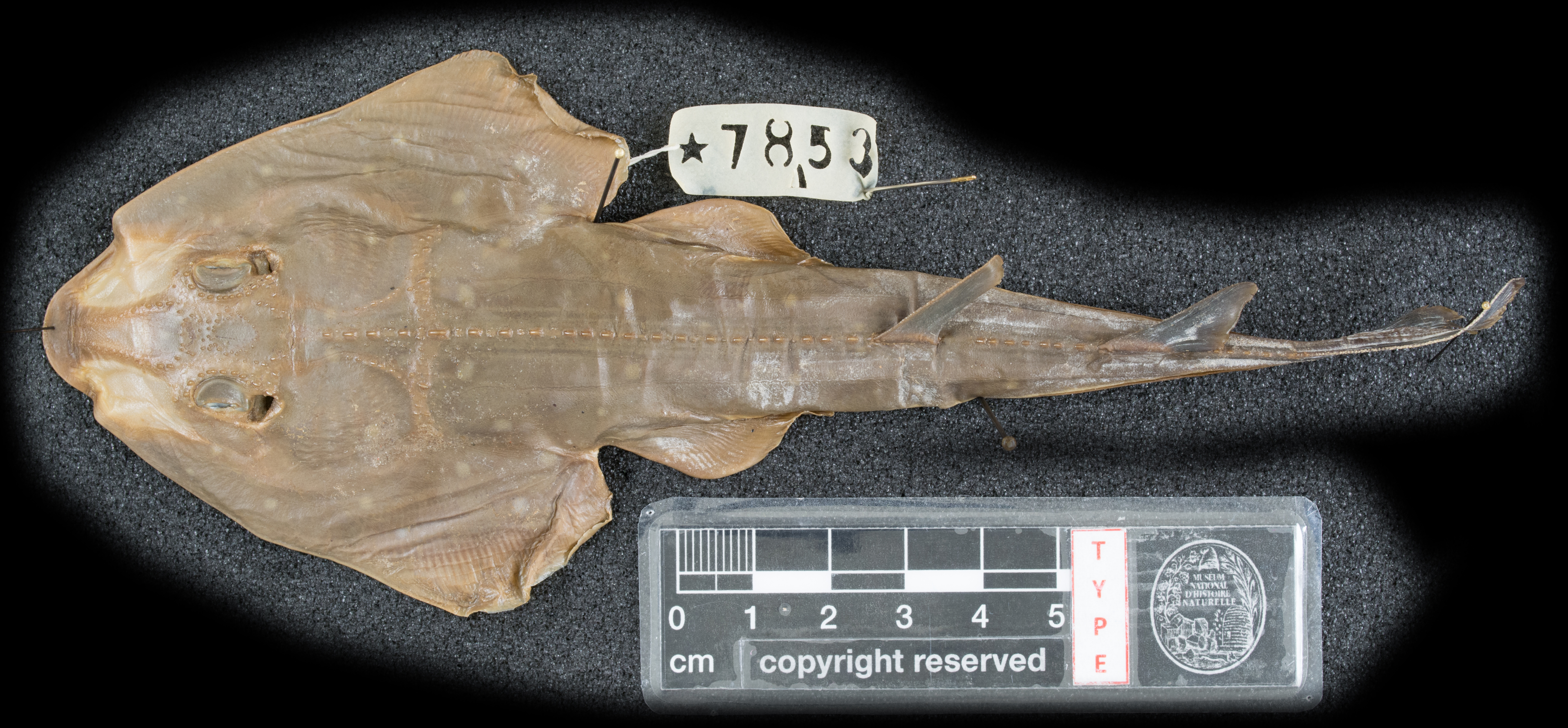
- A female juvenile A. blochii preserved in alcohol

Conservation status
- Least Concern (IUCN 3.1)

Scientific classification
- Kingdom: Animalia
- Phylum: Chordata
- Class: Chondrichthyes
- Subclass: Elasmobranchii
- Order: Rhinopristiformes
- Family: Rhinobatidae
- Genus: Acroteriobatus
- Species: A. blochii

Binomial name
- Acroteriobatus blochii J. P. Müller & Henle, 1841

Synonyms
- Rhinobatos blochii (Müller & Henle, 1841); Rhinobatos blochii Müller & Henle, 1841; Rhinobatus blochii Müller & Henle, 1841

= Bluntnose guitarfish =

Species of cartilaginous fish

The bluntnose guitarfish or fiddlefish (Acroteriobatus blochii) is a species of ray in the family Rhinobatidae. It is found in Angola, Namibia, and South Africa. Its natural habitats are shallow seas and estuarine waters. It is potentially threatened by habitat loss owing to diamond mining on the Namibian coast. A. blochii is frequently misidentified as and closely related to A. annulatus.
