= Pseudobatos glaucostigma =

Conservation status
- Vulnerable (IUCN 3.1)

Scientific classification
- Kingdom: Animalia
- Phylum: Chordata
- Class: Chondrichthyes
- Subclass: Elasmobranchii
- Order: Rhinopristiformes
- Family: Rhinobatidae
- Genus: Pseudobatos
- Species: P. glaucostigma

Binomial name
- Pseudobatos glaucostigma (Jordan & Gilbert, 1883)

Species of cartilaginous fish

Pseudobatos glaucostigma, the speckled guitarfish, is a species of ray in the family Rhinobatidae.

== Appearance ==
The speckled guitarfish gets up to 89 cm (35 in). It looks like a cross between a shark and a ray. Its colours are brown with blue or gray spots around the head. It has dorsal and caudal fins on the lower half of the body. The bottom part of the body is white for counter shading. It has a somewhat pointed snout and it has small spines along its back

== Distribution ==
This species of guitarfish lives in the Eastern Central and Southeast Pacific Ocean, from Mexico to Ecuador. It is found in several countries, including Mexico, Guatemala, Ecuador, Costa Rica, Panama, El Salvador and Colombia.

== Habitat ==
It likes areas with mangroves or sandy, muddy or gravelly bottoms, often near reefs, bays and estuaries at depths of 0–122 m (0–400 ft), where it forms large schools.

== Diet ==
Adults of this species mainly eat crustaceans and molluscs, while juveniles mainly eat amphipod crustaceans.

== Conservation status ==
The speckled guitarfish is listed as Vulnerable by the IUCN Red List and its population is decreasing. Its main threat is fishing for food and the aquarium trade even though it is monitored in the trade, it is still a problem.
