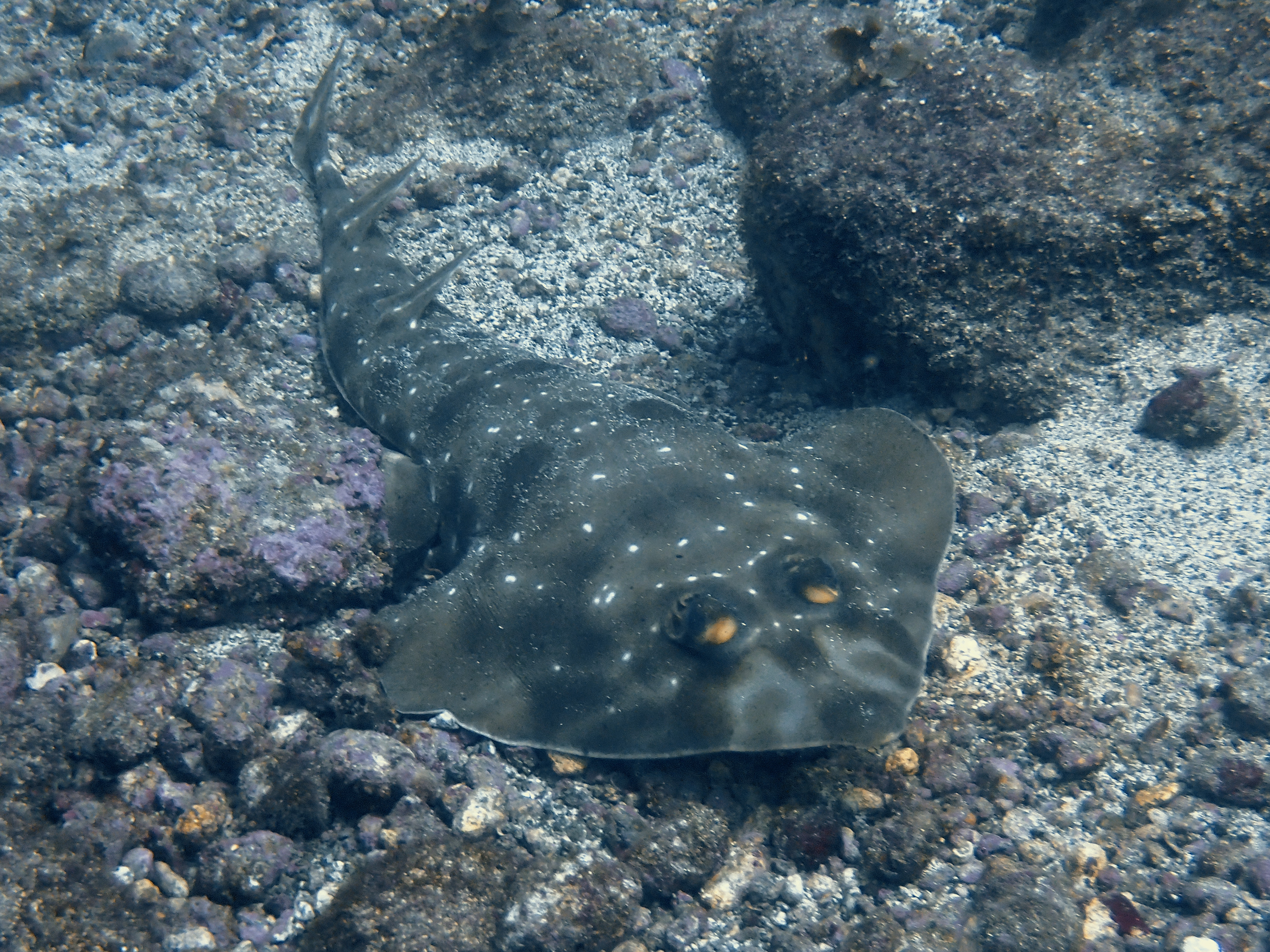

Conservation status
- Vulnerable (IUCN 3.1)

Scientific classification
- Kingdom: Animalia
- Phylum: Chordata
- Class: Chondrichthyes
- Subclass: Elasmobranchii
- Order: Rhinopristiformes
- Family: Rhinobatidae
- Genus: Pseudobatos
- Species: P. prahli

Binomial name
- Pseudobatos prahli (Acero P. & Franke, 1995)

Synonyms
- Rhinobatos prahli Acero P. & Franke, 1995

= Pseudobatos prahli =

Species of cartilaginous fish

Pseudobatos prahli, also known by its common name Gorgona guitarfish is a species from the genus Pseudobatos. It is distinguished from other members of the genus by its coloration and rostral cartilages, and is native to the eastern Pacific Ocean.

== Species description ==
The Gorgona Guitarfish is a benthic, coastal marine batoid (ray/skate) that has a body type similar to others in its genus; flattened with symmetric dorsal fins, a pointed snout, a long, asymmetrical tail with no lower lobe, and a triangular body. P. prahli can be distinguished from other guitarfishes by its distinct coloring and rostral cartilages. Its dorsal side is brown with white spots and speckles, darker brown splotches, and its ventral side is tan. The brown coloration appears during early stage embryonic development, with the dots only appearing in late stage development. The rostral cartilages are unique for being widely spaced and converging at the tip of the snout in a round shape ^{[4]}. This guitarfish is a medium-sized fish, but has a large size variation. Its minimum and maximum recorded weight is 540g and 2220g, respectively.

Typically the size range is from 50 cm TL to 90 cm TL, but the average size at maturity is 65.9 cm for females and 61.8 cm TL for males. The smallest specimen found was 151 mm, caught in 2013 off the coast of Mexico, but it's likely that that was an embryo, as stalk remnants from the yolk sac were found on the ventral side.

They are a mesopredator, meaning that they are neither at the bottom nor top of the food chain. They both prey on smaller fish and small marine invertebrates, and are preyed upon by larger fish, like sharks.

== Taxonomy ==
The gorgona guitarfish used to be in the family Rhinobatos, but a molecular and morphological study supports the creation of a new family for the Gorgona Guitarfish, as well as other amphi-American guitarfish, called Pseudobatos. While morphologically similar to other Rhinobatos, key features can be used to identify this specific species (as stated above in Species Description). Additionally, the Rhinobatos genus is found in the Indo-Western Pacific and Eastern Atlantic Ocean, while the Pseudobatos is found in the Eastern Pacific and Western Atlantic. They are members of the clade Batomorphi within the class Elasmobranchii, a class of all cartilaginous fish.

== Distribution ==
Typically, guitarfish are found in temperate to coastal regions, often in areas of food insecurity and high fishing demands, further putting stress on the group.

The family Pseudobatos lives on both sides of the American continent (Eastern Pacific and Western Atlantic), while P. prahli lives in the Eastern Pacific Ocean. The first observance of this species was in the Columbian Pacific, and its range is from northern Peru all the way to the southernmost coast of the Baja peninsula. However, the Gorgana Guitarfish has been under-researched, so it is unknown if the range is patchy or continuous. They dwell on the bottom of the ocean floor, in sandy, slightly rocky areas, around 18–24 m in depth, but have been found in much shallower depths, at 3–4 m. Contrasting this, some believe that they spend most of their time in depths deeper than 60m, since the species has not been reported in trawl nets at depths of 5–62 m.

More study should be done on this species to understand what depths it typically inhabits. One explanation for this could be migratory behavior caused by Tehuano winds, which has been observed in other rays. Tehuano winds, a strong wind that passes through Chivela Pass into the Eastern Pacific coast in southern Mexico between October and February, moves surface water away from the coast, creating an upswelling affect that limits warm, oxygen rich water in deeper parts of the ocean. Pseudobatos prahli could be traveling towards the coast in this time, seeking out the warmer, oxygen rich water, and this could explain the discordance in depths at which the fish has been found.

== Life History ==
Pseudobatos prahli lives in shallow water, and is often incidentally caught in shrimp trawling nets. They have been observed semipburied in sand at the ocean floor, as show in the photo below. The Pseudobatos genus tends to be a generalist in diet, and typically consumes benthic invertebrates like snails and small, pelagic fish

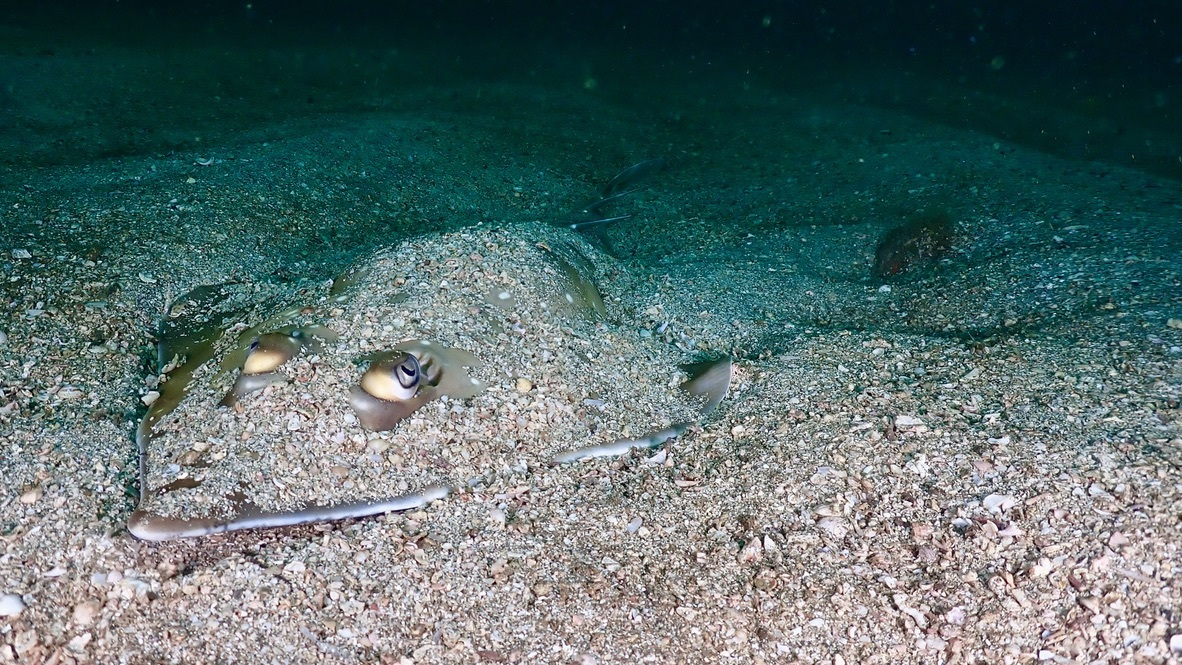
A gorgona guitarfish semiburied in the sand, off the coast of Costa Rica

While it could be due to fishing in the area, one interesting fact about the gorgona guitarfish is the possible sex segregation behavior. Frequent among elasmobranchs, females are primarily found in one area, and males are found in another.

The Rhinobatidae, the family of guitarfish, partake in matrotrophy through uterine milk, where the embryo feeds on yolk and then indirect absorption of other fluids, supplemented by the mother. P. prahli females are larger than males when sexual maturity is reached, have a gestation period of 12 months, and give live birth around March. Their offspring are estimated to be 22.5 cm long, but the individuals in that particular study were smaller than average, and so average offspring may be bigger.

== Conservation Status ==
Pseudobatos prahli is listed as vulnerable in the redlist. One challenge is the fish's fecundity- it has the lowest biological productivity of the Pseudobatos family, as well as the fact that it is hunted for its meat in Mexico. For Pacific guitarfish in general, there has been a 30-49% decrease in population over the past 15 years. They are primarily caught by artisanal fisheries, meaning small scale, low-tech fisheries, and are referred to by "guitarra". In 2012, Mexico instilled a ban on elasmobranch fishing from the months of May through August, in an effort to conserve the fish.

Typically, studies focus on sharks in a higher trophic level, due to their commercial and ecological importance. Smaller elasmobranch predators are understudied, despite their vital location in the trophic scale and indirect habitat alteration.
