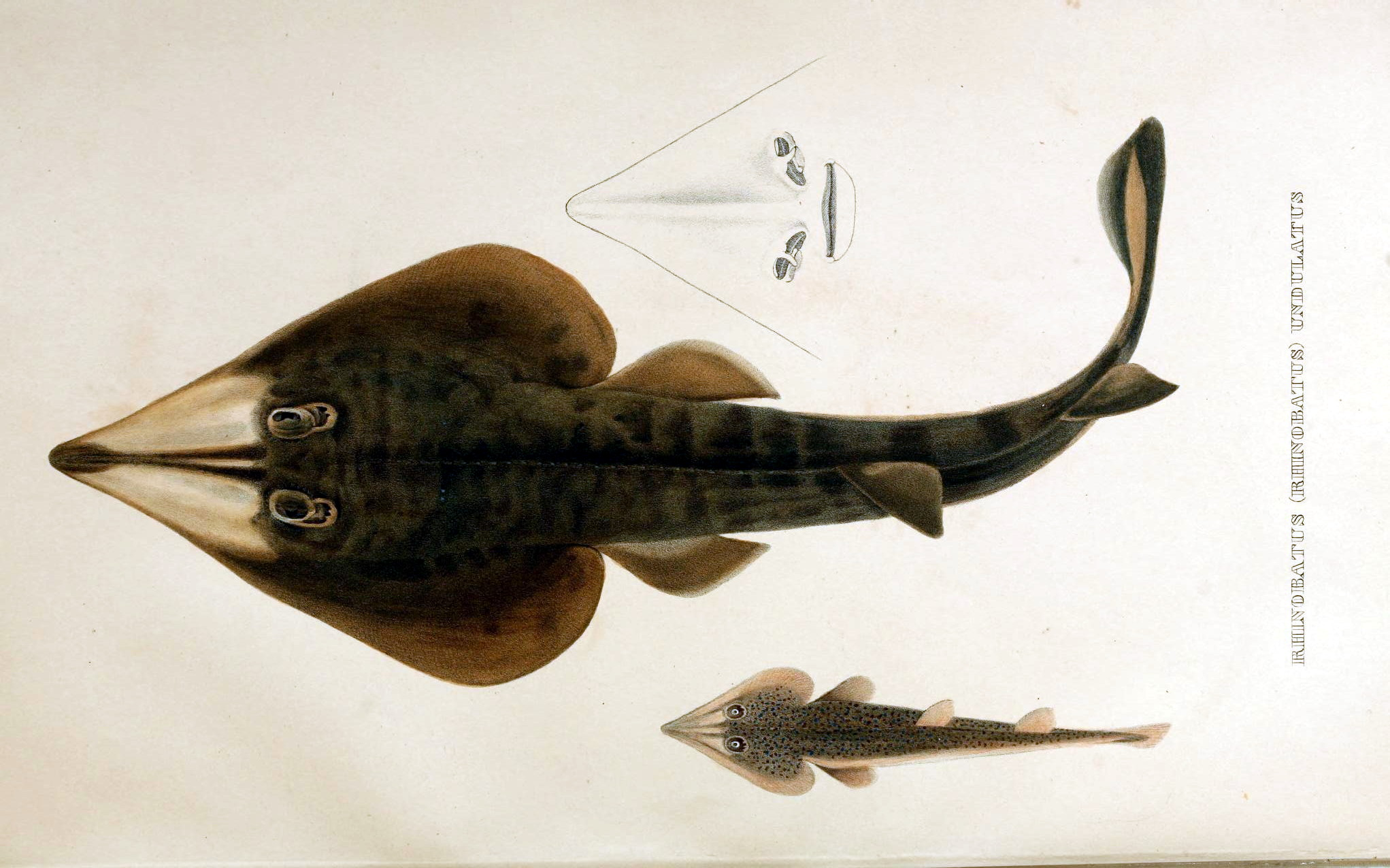

Conservation status
- Endangered (IUCN 3.1)

Scientific classification
- Kingdom: Animalia
- Phylum: Chordata
- Class: Chondrichthyes
- Subclass: Elasmobranchii
- Order: Rhinopristiformes
- Family: Rhinobatidae
- Genus: Pseudobatos
- Species: P. percellens

Binomial name
- Pseudobatos percellens (Walbaum, 1792)

Synonyms
- Raja percellen Walbaum, 1792; Rhinobatos percellens (Walbaum, 1792)

= Pseudobatos percellens =

Chola guitarfish

Species of cartilaginous fish

Pseudobatos percellens, commonly called the Chola guitarfish, is a species of fish in the Rhinobatidae family found in the western South Atlantic Ocean.

Three different genetic lineages have been identified in the species by Vanessa P. Cruz and co-workers.

== Conservation status ==
The species is listed as Endangered by the International Union for the Conservation of Nature.
