= Philippine guitarfish =

Conservation status
- Critically Endangered (IUCN 3.1)

Scientific classification
- Kingdom: Animalia
- Phylum: Chordata
- Class: Chondrichthyes
- Subclass: Elasmobranchii
- Order: Rhinopristiformes
- Family: Rhinobatidae
- Genus: Rhinobatos
- Species: R. whitei

Binomial name
- Rhinobatos whitei (Corrigan & Naylor, 2014)

Species of cartilaginous fish

The Philippine guitarfish, known formally as Rhinobatos whitei, is a critically endangered species of cartilaginous fish in the genus Rhinobatos. The species has been documented in the Pacific Ocean near the Philippines. The documented sizes of Philippine guitarfish specimens ranges between 556-720 mm for male adults and female adults exceeding 720 mm. The observed characteristics of the guitarfish is the difference of morphological features, coloration, pelvic and caudal features. The observation of the species is rather rare due to the lack of sightings, capturing of the species, or mixing the taxonomic features with other species of guitarfish.

Morphological Features

Disc shape: The observed shape of given specimens were broadly wedge-shaped with a blunt anterior and mildly bottlenose shape, differing from other species of its form.

Tail Structure: The tail is observed to be elongated and slender, observed to be thicker and proximally to the body and becomes more slender distally.

Coloration

Blotches and spots: Rusty brown blotches with faint white spots.

Pelvic and Caudal Features

Pelvic Rays and Radials: Observed pelvic rays is 24-26

Caudal Centra Count: Observed caudal centra 43-48, relatively higher than other observed specimens within the species.
