= Acroteriobatus omanensis =

Oman guitarfish

Conservation status
- Data Deficient (IUCN 3.1)

Scientific classification
- Kingdom: Animalia
- Phylum: Chordata
- Class: Chondrichthyes
- Subclass: Elasmobranchii
- Order: Rhinopristiformes
- Family: Rhinobatidae
- Genus: Acroteriobatus
- Species: A. omanensis

Binomial name
- Acroteriobatus omanensis Last, Henderson & Naylor, 2016
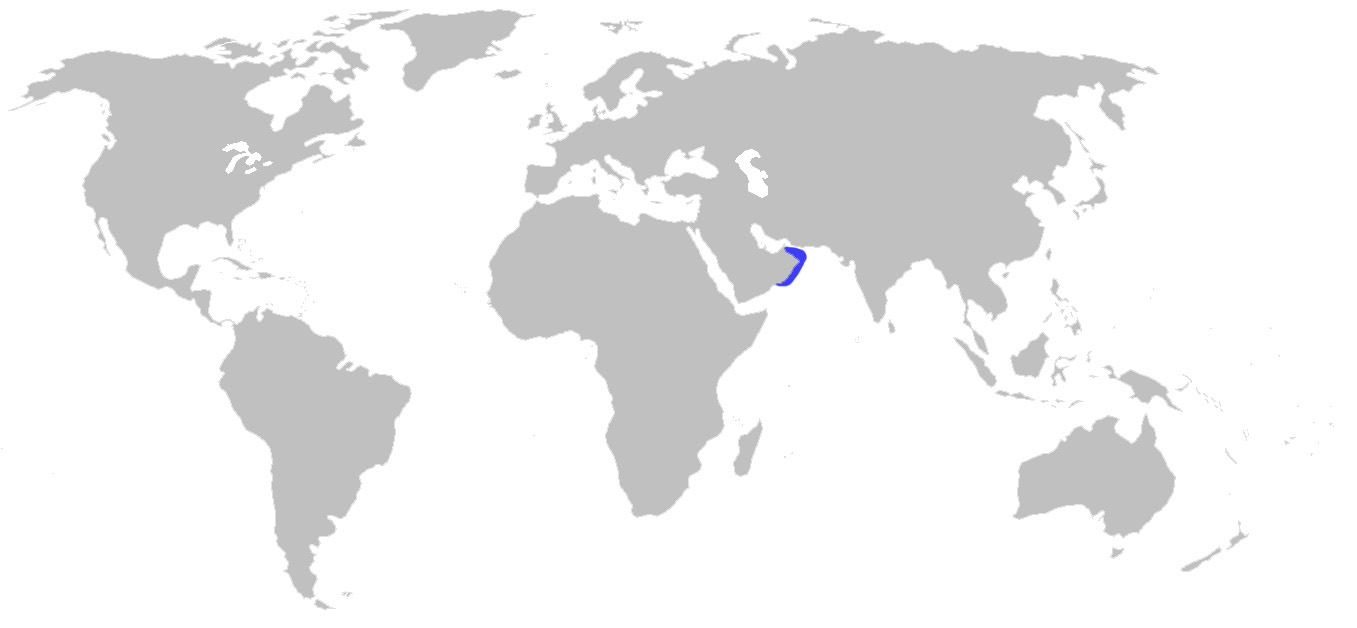
- Range of Oman guitarfish

Species of guitarfish

Acroteriobatus omanensis, the Oman guitarfish, is a type of guitarfish of the family Rhinobatidae found in Gulf of Oman and Arabian Sea. There has only been a handful of specimens discovered in fish landings in Muscat. Therefore, its population and potential threats are not specifically known to scientists.

== Description ==
The Oman guitarfish differs from its congeners by its dense pattern of small, symmetrical arrangement of ocelli (each consisting of a white spot surrounded by a darker rim) and very narrowly pointed nose. This small guitarfish can reach 60 cm in total length.

== Habitat and distribution ==
The Oman guitarfish inhabits the sedimentary subtidal zone at depths of up to 100 m (328 ft). It is thought to occur in muddy and sandy area of the sea floor.

The population of this species is still poorly known due to the lack of fisheries data and specimens collected. However, guitarfish is generally prone to overfishing and housing/urban area expansion (especially land reclamation).
