= Rhinobatos holcorhynchus =

Slender guitarfish

Conservation status
- Data Deficient (IUCN 3.1)

Scientific classification
- Kingdom: Animalia
- Phylum: Chordata
- Class: Chondrichthyes
- Subclass: Elasmobranchii
- Order: Rhinopristiformes
- Family: Rhinobatidae
- Genus: Rhinobatos
- Species: R. holcorhynchus

Binomial name
- Rhinobatos holcorhynchus Norman, 1922

Synonyms
- Rhinobatus holcorhynchus Norman, 1922

Species of cartilaginous fish

Rhinobatos holcorhynchus, commonly known as the slender guitarfish, is a guitarfish from the genus Rhinobatos that has a broadly wedge-shaped disc, a long, narrowly triangular snout, and a distinctive teardrop-shaped black blotch near the ventral snout tip. It is a medium-to-large benthic ray endemic to the deep continental shelf regions of the South-West Indian Ocean.

== Morphology and comparative anatomy ==
The slender guitarfish is a medium-to-large species of Rhinobatos, capable of reaching up to 127 cm (50 in) in total length (TL). The species possesses a distinct disc that is somewhat thick and broadly wedge-shaped, with its length measuring approximately 1.2 to 1.38 times its maximum width. The snout is bluntly pointed (snout angle ~55.7°–65°), and the presocket snout length is notably long, accounting for 15.2–16.0% of its total length.

=== Coloration ===
The dorsal surface is a solid, plain dark olive green to olive brown, completely devoid of any spots, transverse bands, or distinct markings. After preservation, this color typically fades to brownish. The ventral surface is mostly white, though the outer margins of the pectoral and pelvic fins may appear slightly dusky. A key diagnostic feature separating it from similar sympatric species is the presence of a conspicuous, teardrop-shaped dark blotch extending from the rostral tip to just anterior to the upper mouth.

=== Taxonomic traits and dentition ===
Rhinobatos holcorhynchus can be identified through highly specific meristic and morphometric markers:

- Dentition: Features 46–47 up to 63–73 close-set tooth rows in the upper and lower jaws, arranged in a quincunx pavement pattern with small, rhomboidal crowns.
- Nasal morphology: Nostrils are large and diagonal, containing 68–75 nasal lamellae. The anterior nasal flaps are narrow and slender. They extend to the inner corner of the nostrils and do not insert into the internarial space, a morphological trait that distinguishes it from the closely related Rhinobatos austini.
- Skeletal structure: The pectoral skeleton contains 71–73 total radials. The vertebral column consists of 199–209 total vertebral segments (synarcual and free centra), with 39–52 monospondylous precaudal centra and 37–38 diplospondylous caudal centra.
- Dermal denticles and thorns: The skin is entirely covered with fine, close-set minute denticles. It possesses a median row of 27–40 large tubercular thorns alternating with smaller thornlets along the midback, 6–18 thorns between the widely spaced dorsal fins, and 3–10 erupted thorns around the anterior orbits.

== Distribution and habitat ==
Rhinobatos holcorhynchus is distributed throughout the South-West Indian Ocean, ranging from the coast of Kenya down to KwaZulu-Natal in South Africa. The species occupies benthic zones, primarily along the continental shelf and upper continental slope. It has been recorded at substantial depths ranging from 73 to 350 m (240 to 1,148 ft).

While its geographic range broadly overlaps with R. austini (from Port Shepstone to central Mozambique), R. holcorhynchus typically occurs further offshore and in significantly deeper waters.

== Conservation and biology ==
Currently categorized as Data Deficient (DD) by the IUCN, much of the slender guitarfish's biological life history remains undocumented. It is periodically taken as bycatch in commercial trawl and gillnet fisheries operating along the continental shelf and slope within its territory.
