= Johann Horkel =

German physician and botanist

Johann Horkel (8 September 1769 in Burg auf Fehmarn – 15 November 1846 in Berlin) was a German medical doctor and botanist.

== Professional career ==
From 1787 he studied medicine at the University of Halle, where in 1802 he was named an associate professor. From 1804 to 1810 he served as a full professor of medicine at Halle, afterwards relocating to Berlin, where he spent the rest of his career as a professor of plant physiology. In 1800/01 he was editor of the journal Archiv für die thierische Chemie, and for a period of time, was an editor of the Deutsches Archiv für die Physiologie.

== Legacy ==
He was an uncle and a significant influence on the career of botanist Matthias Jakob Schleiden. The botanical genera Horkelia (Cham. & Schltdl.) and Horkeliella (Rydb.) commemorate his name, as does the fish species Rhinobatos horkelii (Brazilian guitarfish).
