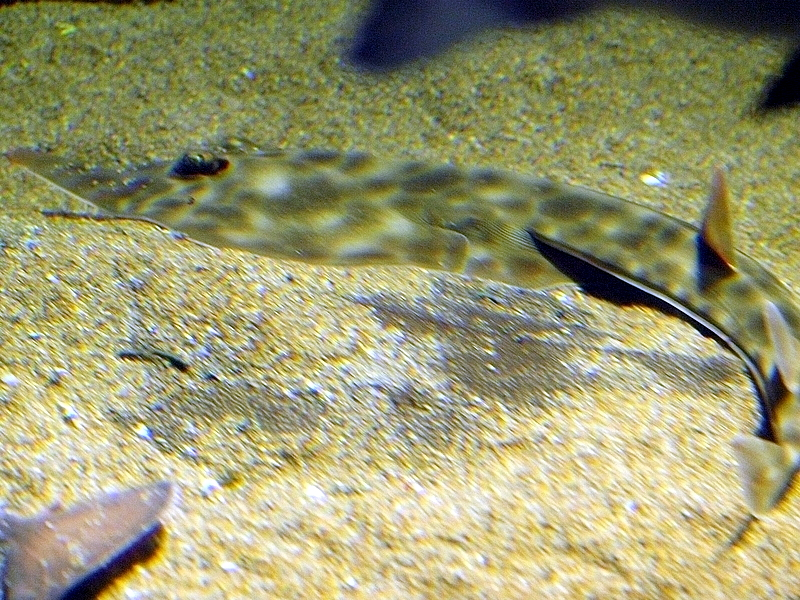

Conservation status
- Critically Endangered (IUCN 3.1)

Scientific classification
- Kingdom: Animalia
- Phylum: Chordata
- Class: Chondrichthyes
- Subclass: Elasmobranchii
- Order: Rhinopristiformes
- Family: Rhinobatidae
- Genus: Rhinobatos
- Species: R. schlegelii

Binomial name
- Rhinobatos schlegelii Müller & Henle, 1841

Synonyms
- Rhinobatos formosensis Norman, 1926

= Brown guitarfish =

Species of cartilaginous fish

The brown guitarfish (Rhinobatos schlegelii) is a species of fish in the Rhinobatidae family. It is a small shark-like ray, up to 100 cm in total length. It is found in North West Pacific between Taiwan and Japan. Its natural habitats are open seas, shallow seas, coral reefs, and estuarine waters. The Taiwan guitarfish (Rhinobatos formosensis) was formerly considered a distinct species, but is now considered a junior synonym.

== Threats ==
The brown guitarfish is threatened by overfishing. It is fished in industrial, artisanal, and subsistence fisheries with multiple gears, including trawl, gillnet, and longline for its meat and fins. The brown guitarfish is rare in Japan and has nearly disappeared from South Korea in the past 20-25 years. In a part of Taiwan it has declined 75-96% in the last 30 years where mainly gravid females are caught.

== Uses ==
It is used for its meat, fins, skin and cartilage. Kyushu, Shikoku and Seto Inland Sea regions in Japan use the meat for sashimi. The meat is considered valuable in Japan and Korea. The fins are consumed domestically in China. Internationally, the skin may be dried and traded as a luxury leather product.
