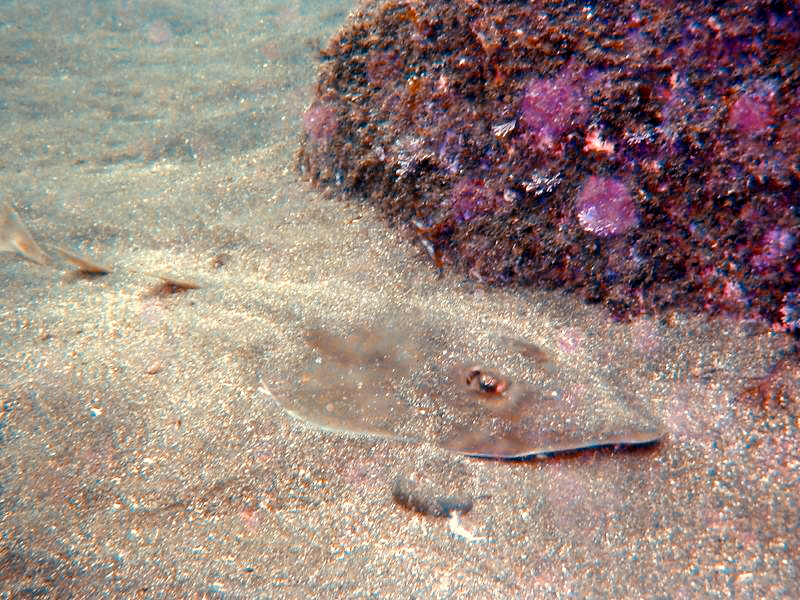

Conservation status
- Endangered (IUCN 3.1)

Scientific classification
- Kingdom: Animalia
- Phylum: Chordata
- Class: Chondrichthyes
- Subclass: Elasmobranchii
- Order: Rhinopristiformes
- Family: Rhinobatidae
- Genus: Rhinobatos
- Species: R. hynnicephalus

Binomial name
- Rhinobatos hynnicephalus J. Richardson, 1846

= Ringstreaked guitarfish =

Species of cartilaginous fish

The ringstreaked guitarfish (Rhinobatos hynnicephalus) is a species of fish in the Rhinobatidae family found in China, Japan, South Korea, Taiwan and Vietnam. Its natural habitats are open seas, shallow seas, coral reefs, and estuarine waters.

Ringstreaked guitarfish have paired reproductive organs and are ovoviviparous with a 1:1 sex ratio.
