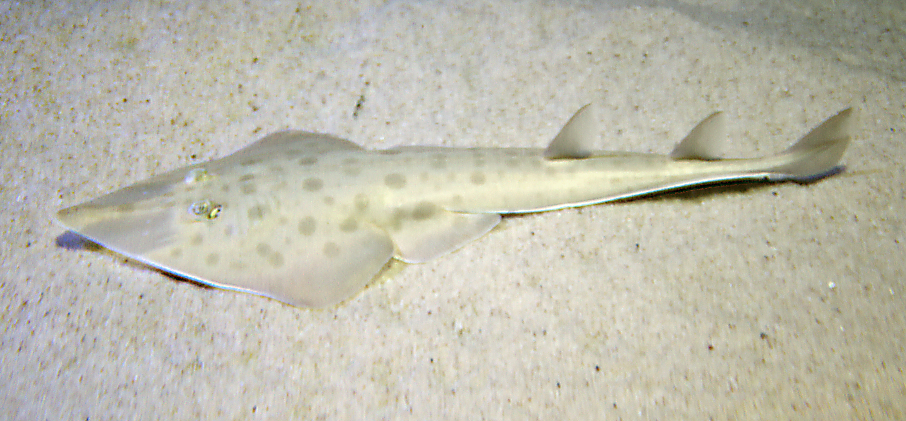
- Acroteriobatus annulatus

Scientific classification
- Kingdom: Animalia
- Phylum: Chordata
- Class: Chondrichthyes
- Subclass: Elasmobranchii
- Order: Rhinopristiformes
- Family: Rhinobatidae
- Genus: Acroteriobatus; Giltay, 1928

= Acroteriobatus =

Genus of cartilaginous fishes

Acroteriobatus is a genus of fish in the Rhinobatidae family. Although its constituent species were previously assigned to Rhinobatos, recent authors treat it as distinct.

They are found near the shore off southern Africa and in the northwestern Indian Ocean. They are brownish above, often with a spotted pattern, and reach up to 60–140 cm (2.0–4.6 ft) depending on the exact species.

== Species ==
There are eight currently recognized species in this genus:

- Acroteriobatus andysabini (2021) (Malagasy blue-spotted guitarfish)
- Acroteriobatus annulatus (J. P. Müller & Henle, 1841) (Lesser guitarfish)
- Acroteriobatus blochii (J. P. Müller & Henle, 1841) (Bluntnose guitarfish)
- Acroteriobatus leucospilus (Norman, 1926) (Grayspotted guitarfish)
- Acroteriobatus ocellatus (Norman, 1926) (Speckled guitarfish)
- Acroteriobatus omanensis Last, Hendeson & Naylor, 2016 (Oman guitarfish)
- Acroteriobatus salalah (J. E. Randall & Compagno, 1995) (Salalah guitarfish)
- Acroteriobatus stehmanni (2021) (Socotra blue-spotted guitarfish)
- Acroteriobatus variegatus (Nair & Lal Mohan, 1973) (Stripenose guitarfish)
- Acroteriobatus zanzibarensis (Norman, 1926) (Zanzibar guitarfish)
