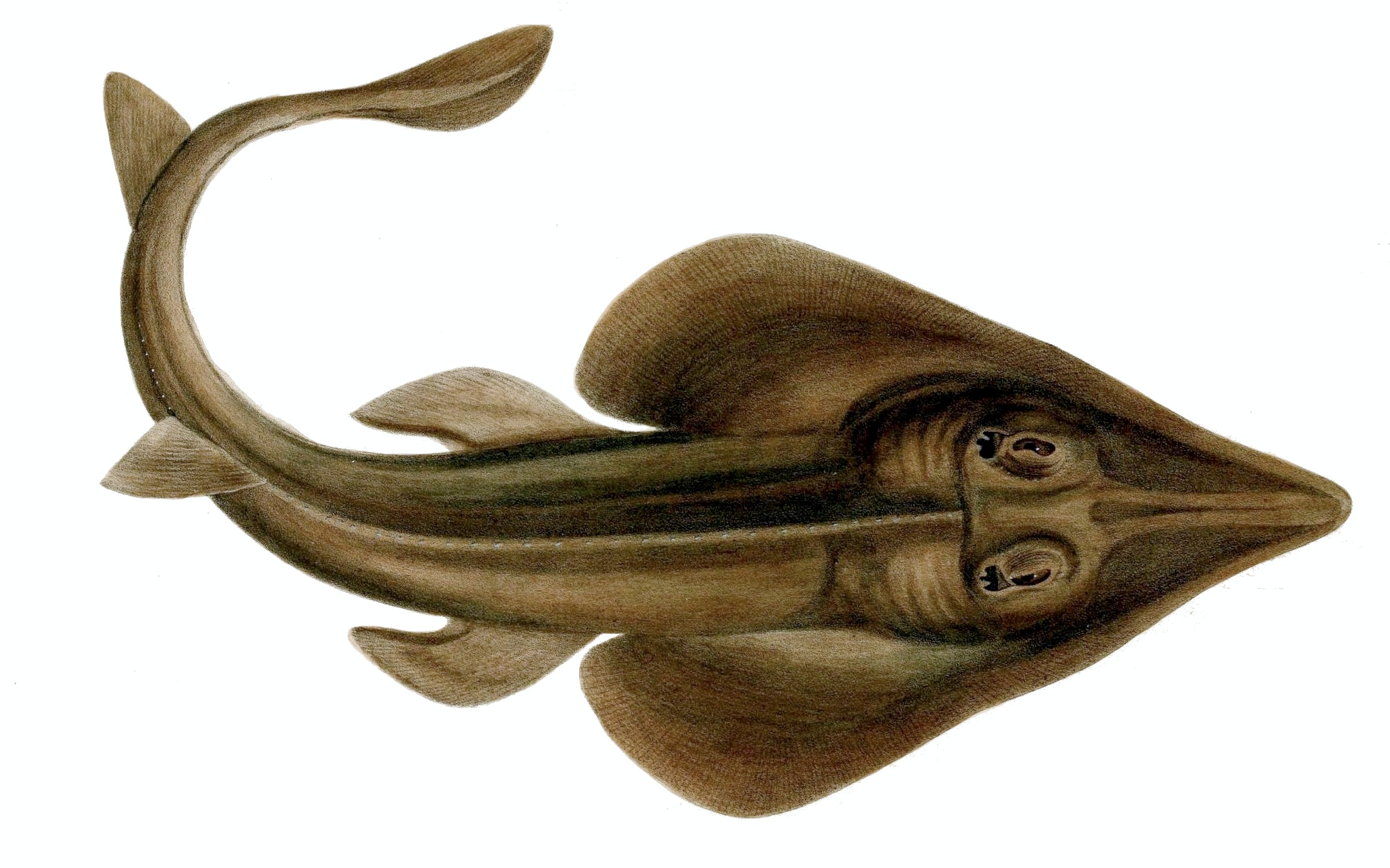

Conservation status
- Critically Endangered (IUCN 3.1)

Scientific classification
- Kingdom: Animalia
- Phylum: Chordata
- Class: Chondrichthyes
- Subclass: Elasmobranchii
- Order: Rhinopristiformes
- Family: Rhinobatidae
- Genus: Pseudobatos
- Species: P. horkelii

Binomial name
- Pseudobatos horkelii (J. P. Müller & Henle, 1841)

Synonyms
- Rhinobatos horkeli Müller & Henle, 1841; Rhinobatus horkelii Müller & Henle, 1841

= Brazilian guitarfish =

Species of fish

The Brazilian guitarfish (Pseudobatos horkelii) is a species of fish in the family Rhinobatidae. It is endemic to Brazil, where its natural habitat is coastal waters on the continental shelf. This fish is viviparous and has a long gestation period, concluding with the birth of live pups in February. At this time the fish are subject to intense fishing activity but catches have been dwindling in recent years as a result of overfishing. Because so few breeding-size fish remain, the International Union for Conservation of Nature has assessed the fish's conservation status as being "critically endangered".

== Taxonomy ==
The Brazilian guitarfish was first described as Rhinobatos horkelii by Müller & Henle in 1841. They named the new species in honour of the German botanist, Dr. Johann Horkel, Professor of Plant Physiology at the University of Berlin, who had sent them a specimen of the fish preserved in alcohol.

== Description ==
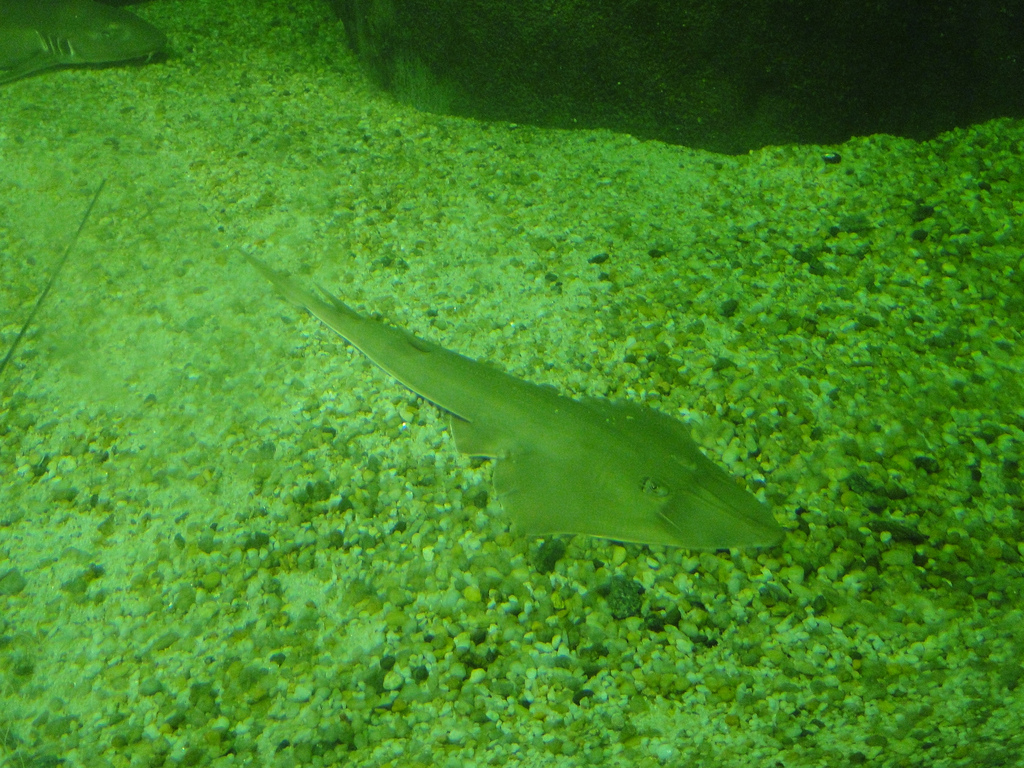
At Peruibe Aquarium, São Paulo, Brazil

This species can grow to a length of 138 cm (54 in), but a more usual adult size is about 60 cm (24 in). The dorsal surface is a uniform olive-grey or brown. There is a dark patch on the snout and the nostrils are long. The crown is transversely flattened or slightly convex.

== Ecology ==
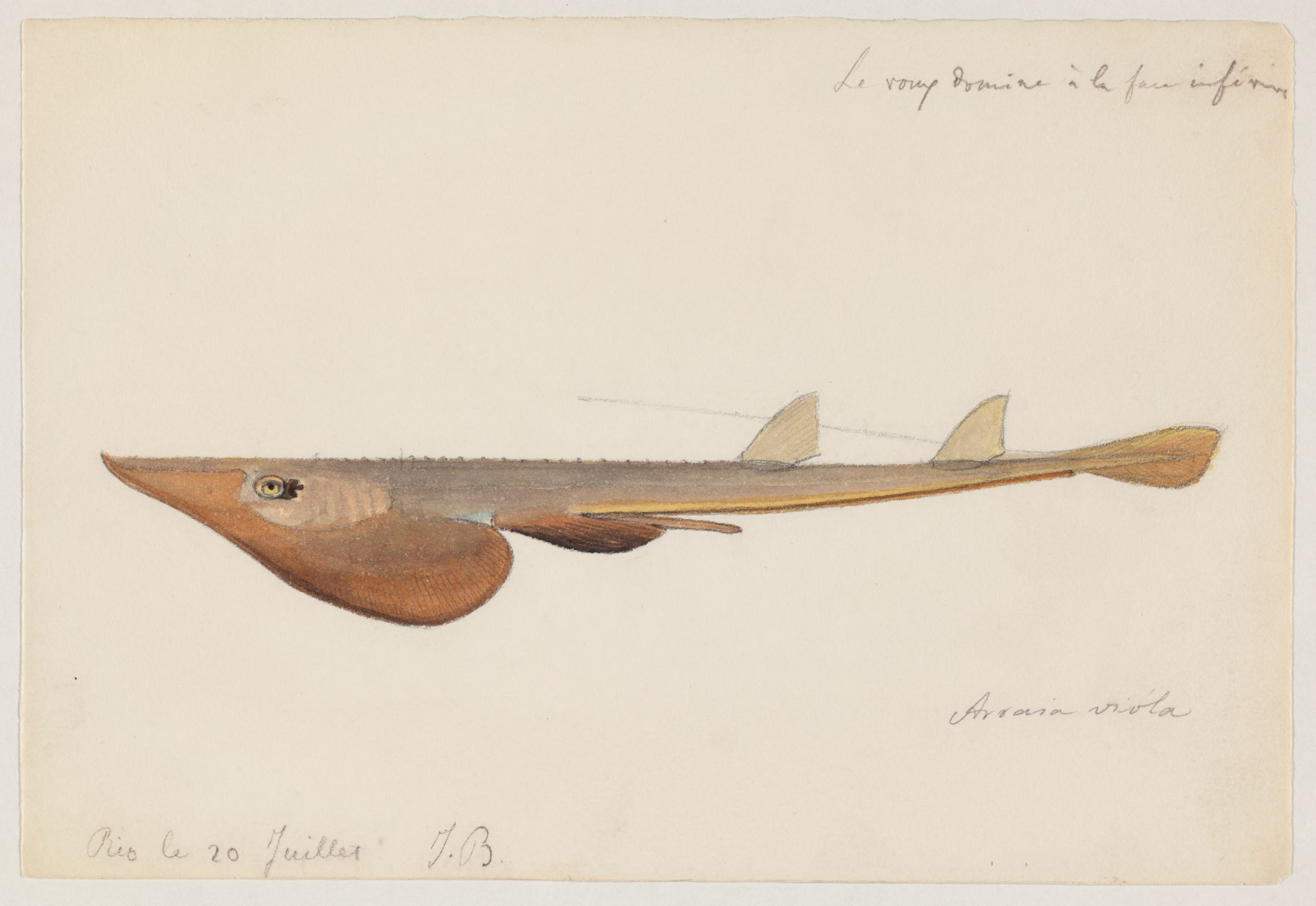
1865 watercolor of a Brazilian guitarfish by Jacques Burkhardt.

The Brazilian guitarfish is a low-fecundity viviparous fish. Mating takes place on the inner continental shelf in March and soon afterwards the adults disperse to outer areas of the shelf. The eggs are contained within a casing and remain dormant inside the female until she return to the warm, shallow waters of the inner continental shelf in November. The young develop inside the female, at first obtaining nourishment from their yolk sacs, and later from maternal uterine secretions; they grow from a length of about 1 cm (0.4 in) in December to about 29 cm (11 in) in February when they are born. The females mature at about 4 years of age and litter sizes range from 4 to 12, with larger fish having larger litters. The inner shelf provides important nursery areas for the young fish. Here both females and juveniles are particularly susceptible to being caught by pair-trawling and beach seine netting. Most of the catch is pregnant females. Later in the year, the adults disperse more widely over the inner shelf and are caught by otter-trawling.

Brazilian guitarfish is the only known host of the "Good Luck" parasitic flatworm Acanthobothrium goleketen.

== Status ==
The major threat faced by P. horkelii is overfishing. The fish is caught by trawling, beach seine and gillnet and has traditionally been the main batoid fish caught along the coast of southern Brazil. The main ports at which it is landed are Rio Grande and Itajaí. In 1975, 842 tonnes were landed at Rio Grande and by 1984, that had risen to 1804 tonnes. Since then the catch has dwindled to 157 tonnes in 2002 and has continued to decline since. In southern Brazil waters, the fish seems to have declined by more than 80% since 1986. Based on this evidence, the International Union for Conservation of Nature is concerned that the Brazilian guitarfish may become extinct within about ten years due to overfishing, and has therefore assessed its conservation status as being "critically endangered".
