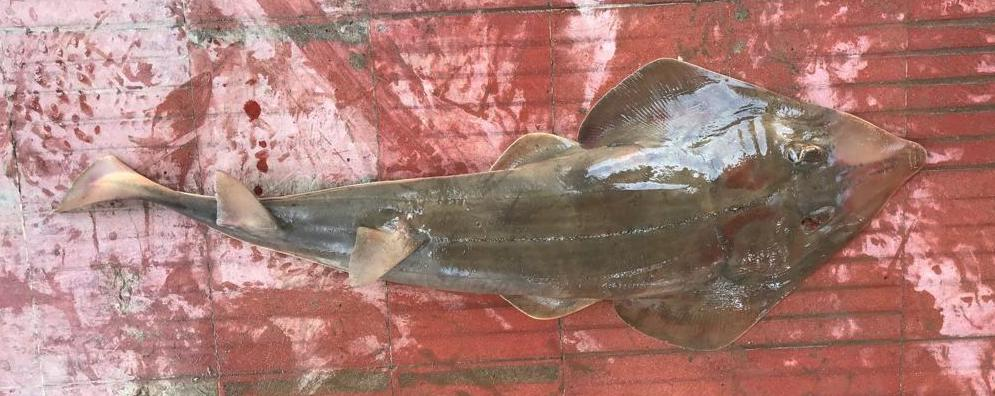

Conservation status
- Vulnerable (IUCN 3.1)

Scientific classification
- Kingdom: Animalia
- Phylum: Chordata
- Class: Chondrichthyes
- Subclass: Elasmobranchii
- Order: Rhinopristiformes
- Family: Rhinobatidae
- Genus: Pseudobatos
- Species: P. planiceps

Binomial name
- Pseudobatos planiceps (Garman, 1880)

Synonyms
- Rhinobatos planiceps

= Flathead guitarfish =

Species of cartilaginous fish

The flathead guitarfish or Pacific guitarfish (Pseudobatos planiceps) is a species of cartilaginous fish in the Rhinobatidae family. It is found in shallow seas around Chile, Ecuador, Peru, and possibly Nicaragua. Its natural habitat is the open sea.
