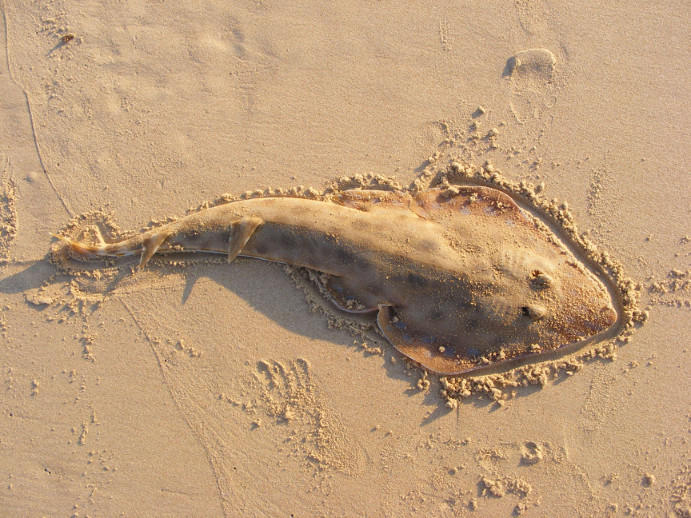

Conservation status
- Endangered (IUCN 3.1)

Scientific classification
- Kingdom: Animalia
- Phylum: Chordata
- Class: Chondrichthyes
- Subclass: Elasmobranchii
- Order: Rhinopristiformes
- Family: Rhinobatidae
- Genus: Acroteriobatus
- Species: A. leucospilus

Binomial name
- Acroteriobatus leucospilus (Norman, 1926)
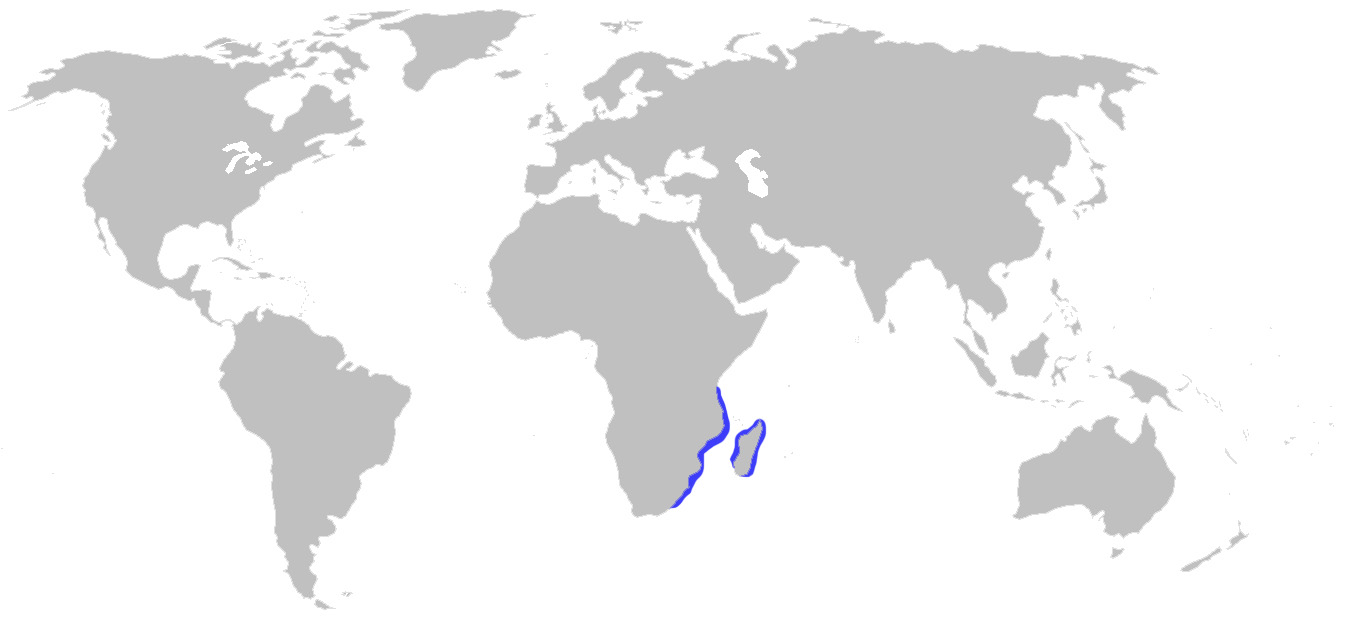
- Range of Greyspotted guitarfish

Synonyms
- Rhinobatos leucospilus Norman, 1926

= Acroteriobatus leucospilus =

Grayspotted guitarfish

Species of fish

Acroteriobatus leucospilus, the grayspotted guitarfish, is a species of guitarfish of the family Rhinobatidae, found along the coast of Madagascar, South Africa, Mozambique, and Tanzania. It has undergone a reduction in population of at least 50% over the past 15 years due to overfishing and harvesting.

== Description ==
The characteristics of the grayspotted guitarfish include the presence of elongated bluish-gray spots on its snout, numerous small bluish spots on the pectoral, pelvic, dorsal, and caudal fins, white ventral surface, white or striped blue-brownish lateral tail folds, and 37 to 41 nasal lamellae counted. Its reproduction system is ovoviviparous, and the maximum length is 96 cm (female specimens).

== Habitat and distribution ==
Grayspotted guitarfish inhabits the inshore area to a depth of 100 m (328 ft).

The coastal areas of its geographic range are known for heavy fishing pressure. This guitarfish is often captured by trawl and gillnet fisheries operating across its habitat. The meat is sold locally, and the fins are exported to Asia.
