= Stripenose guitarfish =

Conservation status
- Critically Endangered (IUCN 3.1)

Scientific classification
- Kingdom: Animalia
- Phylum: Chordata
- Class: Chondrichthyes
- Subclass: Elasmobranchii
- Order: Rhinopristiformes
- Family: Rhinobatidae
- Genus: Acroteriobatus
- Species: A. variegatus

Binomial name
- Acroteriobatus variegatus (Nair & Lal Mohan, 1973)

Synonyms
- Rhinobatos variegatus Nair & Lal Mohan, 1973

Species of cartilaginous fish

The stripenose guitarfish (Acroteriobatus variegatus) is a species of fish in the Rhinobatidae family endemic to the eastern coast of India, and Sri Lanka. Its natural habitat is in the neritic zone.

== Habitat ==
The stripenose guitarfish lives mainly at the depths of 10 to 40 meters, although specimens of the stripenose guitarfish have been collected at 366 meters. There is some information that indicates that they prefer coral reefs.

== Size ==
The stripenose guitarfish is a small fish, with males reaching up to 65 centimeters in length and 75 centimeters for females. They have a small litter size, usually giving birth to 1 from 4 and at most 6. The generation length of each fish is around five years.

== Endangerment ==
The population of the stripenose guitarfish is declining significantly due to fishing by trawlers on the coast of India and Sri Lanka.
