= Pseudobatos leucorhynchus =

Whitesnout guitarfish

Conservation status
- Vulnerable (IUCN 3.1)

Scientific classification
- Kingdom: Animalia
- Phylum: Chordata
- Class: Chondrichthyes
- Subclass: Elasmobranchii
- Order: Rhinopristiformes
- Family: Rhinobatidae
- Genus: Pseudobatos
- Species: P. leucorhynchus

Binomial name
- Pseudobatos leucorhynchus (Günther, 1867)

Synonyms
- Rhinobatos leucorhynchus Günther, 1867

Species of cartilaginous fish

Pseudobatos leucorhynchus, commonly called the whitesnout guitarfish, is a species of fish in the family Rhinobatidae found in the Eastern Central part of the Pacific Ocean. It was originally named Rhinobatos leucorhynchus by Albert Günther, a naturalized British scientist, in 1867.

== Conservation status ==
It is rated as Vulnerable by the International Union for Conservation of Nature. The population is decreasing and severely fragmented.
