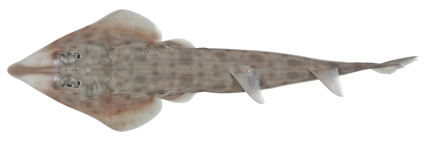

Conservation status
- Least Concern (IUCN 3.1)

Scientific classification
- Kingdom: Animalia
- Phylum: Chordata
- Class: Chondrichthyes
- Subclass: Elasmobranchii
- Order: Rhinopristiformes
- Family: Rhinobatidae
- Genus: Rhinobatos
- Species: R. sainsburyi

Binomial name
- Rhinobatos sainsburyi Last, 2004

= Goldeneye shovelnose ray =

Species of cartilaginous fish

The goldeneye shovelnose ray (Rhinobatos sainsburyi) is a species of fish in the Rhinobatidae family. It is endemic to north-western Australia (Monte Bello Islands to Melville Island). Its natural habitat is open seas.
