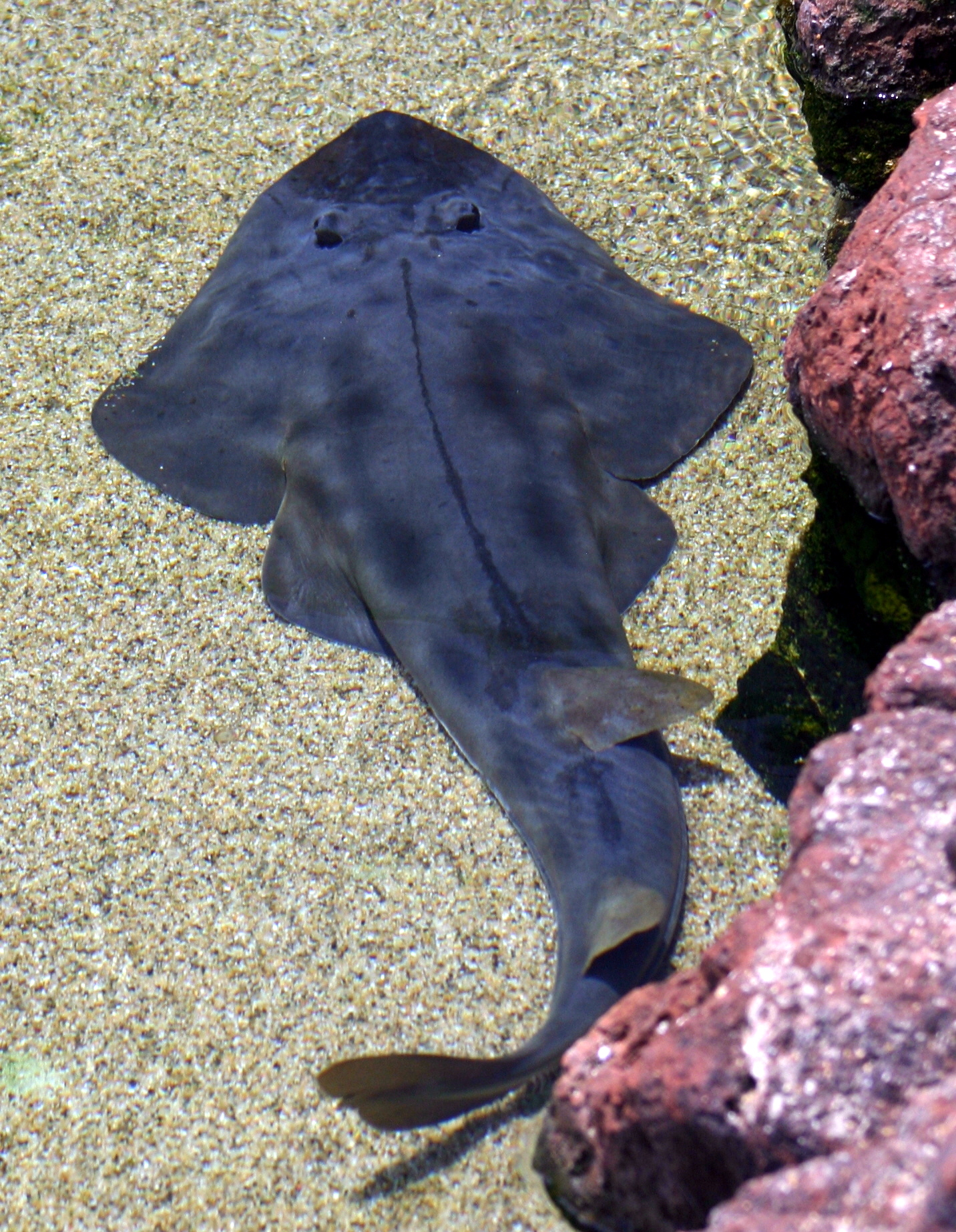

Conservation status
- Near Threatened (IUCN 3.1)

Scientific classification
- Kingdom: Animalia
- Phylum: Chordata
- Class: Chondrichthyes
- Subclass: Elasmobranchii
- Order: Rhinopristiformes
- Family: Rhinobatidae
- Genus: Pseudobatos
- Species: P. productus

Binomial name
- Pseudobatos productus (Ayres, 1854)
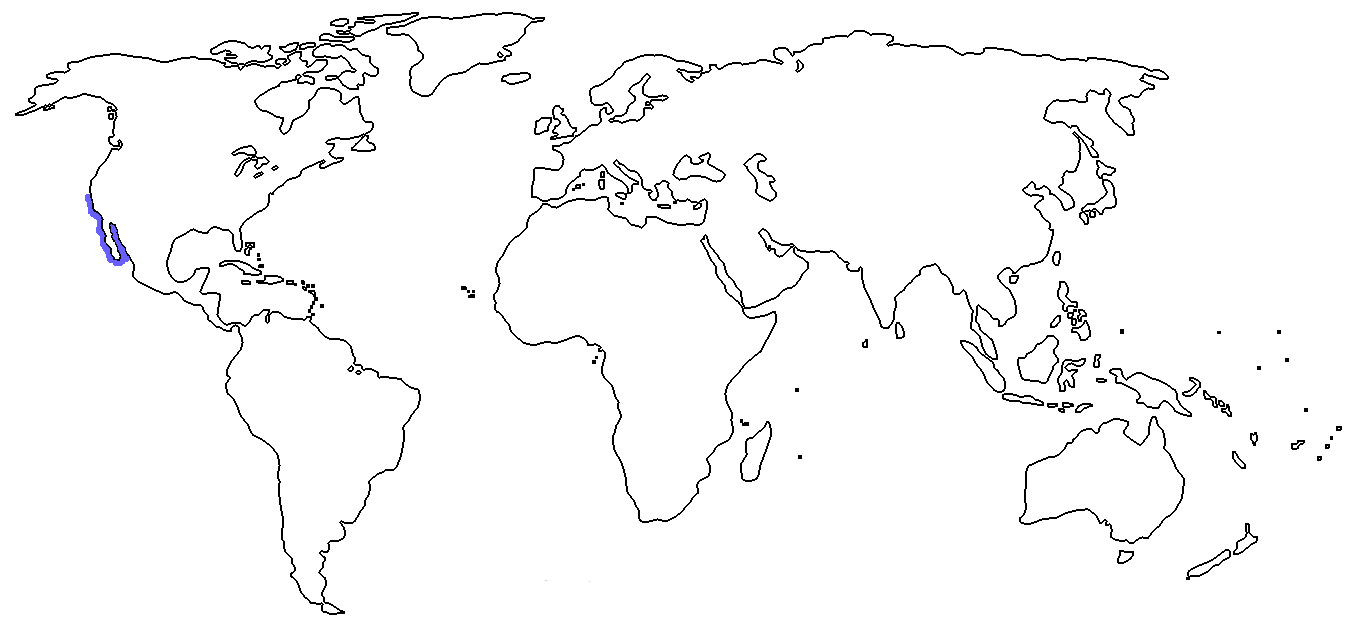
- Range of P. productus

= Shovelnose guitarfish =

Species of ray

The shovelnose guitarfish (Pseudobatos productus) is a ray in the family Rhinobatidae. P. productus was first described by ichthyologist William Orville Ayre in 1854 as Rhinobatos productus, with the genus derived from the Greek word rhinos, meaning nose, and the Latin word batis, meaning ray. It was later placed in the genus Pseudobatos following reconsideration of many species placed in Rhinobatos. As its common name suggests, this species possesses a pointed shovel-shaped snout and a body similar to that of a guitar with a larger head and long, slender body. The shovelnose is considered to be a primitively developed ray, with many features of both sharks and rays. The shovelnose guitarfish was first considered to be a shark because of its dorsal fins' shape. Fossils of P. productus ancestors have been recovered, dating back over 100 million years.

== Description ==
The coloration of this species ranges from olive to sandy brown which aids in the species' ability to camouflage in the sand. Other identifying features of Pseudobatos productus include a depressed body shape with a dorsoventrally flattened opaque snout, no gap between the pectoral and pelvic fins, and protruding eyes. This species also has two dorsal fins which are closer to the posterior end of its body and caudal fin. Shovelnose guitarfish have around 102 to 112 small round teeth. Sexual maturity is reached in females at an estimated age of 8 years and 7 years in males.

This species exhibits sexual dimorphism in which females tend to be larger than males. Males are between 90–100 cm (35–39 in) long, while females are around 99 cm (39 in) at that age. The average size of shovelnose guitarfish is still not well known as many studies have seen fluctuations in the total length they can reach. The ray can live up to 11 years, and full-grown sizes are around 120 cm (47 in) for males, and females reach 137 cm (54 in). The shovelnose guitarfish may be mistaken for similar batoids such as the Atlantic guitarfish, Rhinobatos lentiginosus, and bowmouth guitarfish, Rhina ancylostoma. However these species tend to be found in different regions. The Atlantic guitarfish has similar anatomical features to that of a shovelnose but is shorter with a maximum length of about 63.5 cm (about 2.08 ft) and lives in the Atlantic Ocean. The bowmouth guitarfish is found in waters of the Indo-West Pacific and has a more rounded snout than the shovelnose, and larger dorsal fins which can reach lengths up to cm (about 9.68 ft).

== Distribution and geographical range ==
Pseudobatos productus inhabits shallow estuaries and bays of the Mexican Pacific ranging from San Francisco, California to Guerrero, Mexico. Additionally, they are widely distributed in the Gulf of California. Research suggests that La Jolla, California is the preferred residency of adult shovelnose guitarfish. Members of this species are not commonly found in open water and tend to remain in coastal ecosystems such as bays, estuaries as well as seagrass beds at depths of less than 40 feet. There have been sightings of shovelnose guitarfish reaching depths of up to 91 meters, but this is uncommon for the species. Females migrate to southern California and Baja in spring to spawn and give birth in the early summer months. Males join them to mate soon thereafter, and they will leave the area together. Studies conducted on shovelnose guitarfish in the Gulf of California and the Pacific coast of Baja California have found morphometric variations in the rays. Morphological and genetic variations occur in the mitochondrial DNA in those found in the Gulf of California, evidencing their isolation from the rest. Rhinobatos productus has magnetic particles in its vestibular receptors, and the magnetic particles are believed to be exogenous in origin. The magnetic particles' spatial arrangement may aid in the sensitivity of the receptors to movements.

== Physiological characteristics ==
Shovelnose guitarfish possess spiracles found behind their eyes which are used to pump water over to gills to absorb oxygen. Because their gills are on the underside of these rays, this allows the species to continue to breathe while remaining on the seafloor. Similar to other fishes, P. productus has a lateral line consisting in a series of sensors that help detect changes in water pressure and movement. Additionally, rays have sensors under their nose and mouth known as the ampullae of Lorenzini. The Ampullae of Lorenzini allows them to detect low levels of electrical currents which alerts to food sources. The visual system of the shovelnose is more extensive and developed than other Elasmobranchii, with multiple large projections connecting to the brain. Almost the entire dorsal and ventral hypothalamus is connected to the visual system but still maintains a similar lack of differentiation as with sharks.

== Feeding and hunting ==
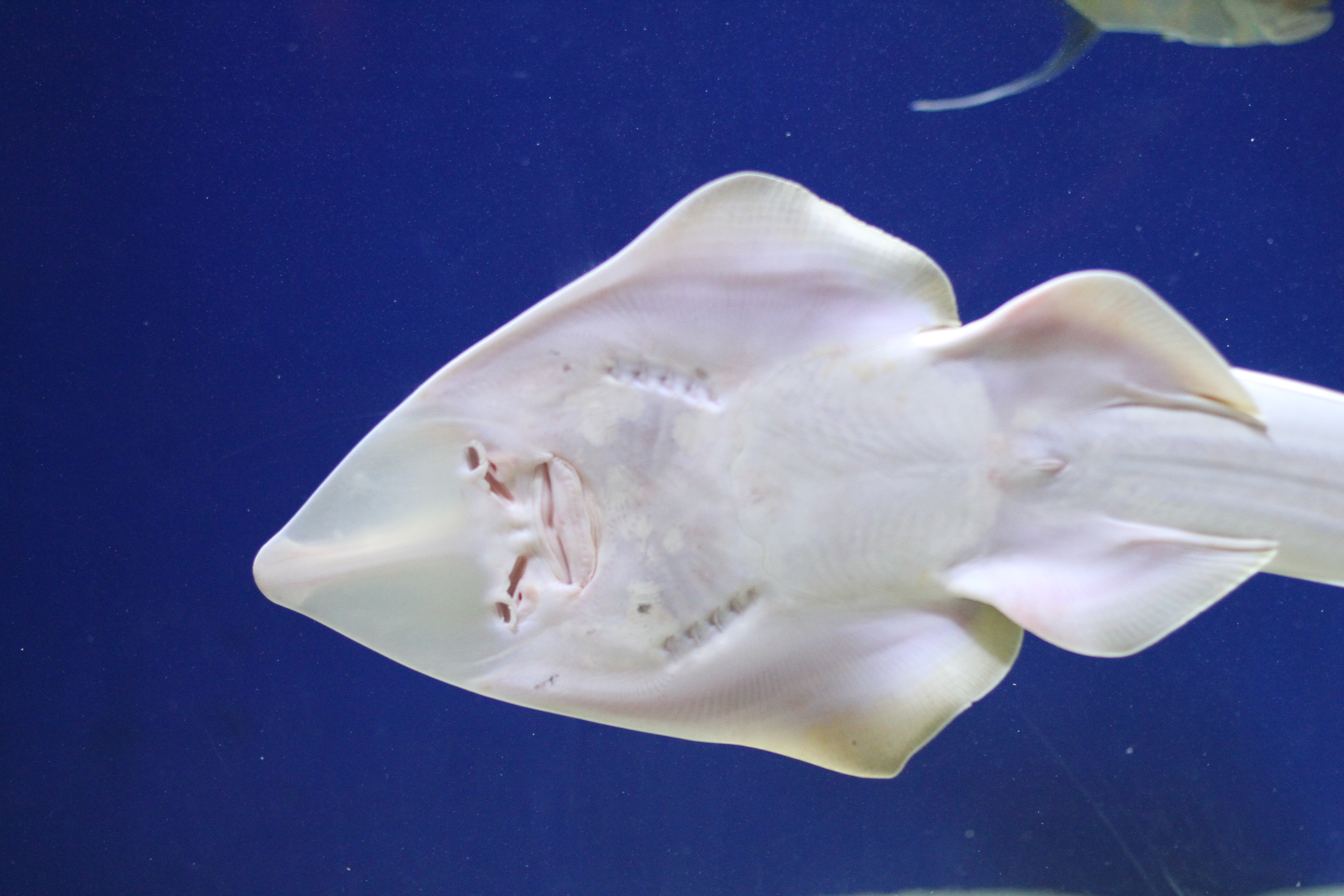
Ventral view of P. productus

Shovelnose guitarfish feed on benthic invertebrates including worms, mollusks, crustaceans, cephalopods, and small fish. Much of their diet consists of decapods such as crabs and shrimps. As bottom-feeders, their mouth is on the underside of their body to easily capture food on the ocean floor. Smaller P. productus specimens tend to be more specialized predators, only feeding on crustaceans. Larger specimens have a more generalized diet but still maintain a diet dominated by crustaceans. The diets of males and females are not significantly different; however, the larger size of females allows them to capture larger prey such as fishes and cephalopods^{[17]}. Females mainly consume shrimp-like prey while males prefer crustaceans.

When hunting, this species will use its pectoral fins to bury itself in the sand leaving only its eyes to watch the seafloor. When prey is visible, the fish will quickly ambush and trap its prey beneath its body, immobilizing it while creating a suction with the mouth to chew and ingest. Shovelnose guitarfish are not efficient at capturing fast-moving prey and therefore must maintain a diet of slow-moving organisms.

P. productus plays an important ecological role in their ecosystem by being both a prey and predatory species in coastal marine areas. They consume fish and mollusks, both second-order consumers, and are prey to coastal sharks, large predatory birds and California sea lions. Additionally, this species serves as a host for many tapeworms and parasitic flukes. Common parasitic and commensal species found on shovelnose guitarfish include Acanthobothrium olseni, Parachristianella monomegacantha, Rhinobatonchocotyle cyclovaginatus, Heterocotyle papillata, Spinuris lophosoma, and Norkus cladocephalus.

== Activity patterns ==
Shovelnose guitarfish are more active at night and in the early morning as this is when they have the most success at hunting prey. Activity is also increased during incoming and high tides compared to outgoing and low tides. The water temperature is also a factor, as more activity is recorded in the species at warmer temperatures between 20°C and 24.58°C. Temperature preference is similar in both males and females of this species. There is also evidence that shovelnose guitarfish regulate their metabolic rate by feeding in warmer waters and resting in cooler waters.

== Sexual maturity and reproductive biology ==
Sexual maturity is determined in males based on the development of claspers. In juvenile P. productus males, the claspers remain flaccid until the specimen reaches a length of about 45cm (about 1.48ft). At 53cm (about 1.74 ft) and above, claspers begin increase in size and calcify gradually. The testes in males also exhibit gradual growth and become embedded in the epigonal organ in mature adults. In females, sexual maturity is determined by the development of the two external-type ovaries. When females reach a length of about 60cm (about 1.97ft), the uterus begins to grow rapidly. Ovum size tends to increase with the length of the female and reaches an average of 12.7mm (about 0.5 in) in mature specimens.

Female shovelnose guitarfish are aplacental viviparous and give birth to live young, but do not develop a placenta. Pregnant females generally carry an average of 5 embryos at a time with a maximum of 10. The size of the female will determine the size of the litter. The sex ratio of these embryos is 1:1. Embryos begin their development in late March and birth occurs 4 to 5 months after from June to October. At birth, the length and weight of P. productus is on average 175mm (about 6.89 in) and 2.7 grams. The gestation period of females is about 12 months. Shovelnose guitarfish are monogamous and will only mate once a year.

The regions shovelnose guitarfish females inhabit can affect their overall fecundity and reproductive parameters. Rays found on the west coast of the Baja California Peninsula appear to have a higher fecundity than those in the Gulf of California. Members of this species in the Gulf of California, however, were recorded to begin their reproductive cycle about 1–2 months earlier than in the west coast of the Baja California Peninsula. Regional geographic differences may explain this as embryonic diapause has been linked to changes in water temperature.

== Embryonic development ==
There are five stages of embryonic development described in Pseudobatos productus. At the first stage, the uterine eggs remain inside the candle case with no compartments between the eggs. The second stage involves embryos still inside the candle case, but they are beginning to develop. The embryos lack pigment in their bodies and remain transparent, but they begin to develop small fin protrusions. At this stage, the eyes are not well developed, and the gill arches start to become visible. During stage three, the candle case ruptures but remains in the uterus around the embryos. The pectoral fins have fused to the branchial region of the head, the body begins to gain pigment, and the eyes have developed. When stage four is reached, the embryos still have an external yolk sac, but entirely resemble adults. The dorsal surface is brown and spots on the snout have developed. Claspers in males at this stage also become visible. Once stage five is reached, the embryos are ready for birth and the external yolk has been completely absorbed.

== Conservation ==
Shovelnose guitarfish were listed as "near threatened" in the Red List of the International Union for Conservation of Nature (IUCN) in 2014. Artisanal fisheries in Northern Mexico harvest copious amounts of this batoid. Additionally, they make up a substantial amount of the incidental catch from the industrial shrimp fishery in the Gulf of California. The movement by pregnant females in shallow waters to breed leaves them susceptible to being caught. Bottom-set gillnets used in the ray fishery in the Gulf of California frequently capture shovelnose guitarfish close to shore. To resolve this problem, a study was conducted on different mesh sizes of gillnets to determine which size these rays were most susceptible to. This was an effort to reduce capture of this species but also maintain fishing in the area. Pseudobatos productus, like many other species of rays, experiences late maturity, slow growth, and a small reproductive rate. To ensure the survival of P. productus, the management of these fisheries is necessary. There is currently a lack of protective regulations for this species in Mexico forcing the species to continue its decline in population. The conservation of this species must be carefully managed to preserve the biological diversity.

== Human interaction ==
=== Recreation ===
Fishing for P. productus is common on the coastal shores of Baja California. In the southern part of the Baja California peninsula, P. productus is a dominant fishery resource. This species is harvested through artisanal fisheries during the summer months for their high value. Adults are primarily caught consisting of mostly pregnant females. This species can be caught from the surf, within shallow California waters. Sand crabs, various bivalves such as mussels, and other live or dead bait are recommended for catching the fish.

=== As food ===
In national markets, shovelnose guitarfish is sold fresh, dried, and as salted filets. The common cuts of meat used from the shovelnose guitarfish are the trunk, tail, and loin, mostly from mature individuals. It has been referred to as "shark steak" within markets and is usually served fried; with other iterations such as cocktails and kebabs being prepared. It is sold as fish and chips in Santa Barbara, California on piers. Dried specimens of all sizes are also frequently sold in shell shops throughout central to Baja California.
