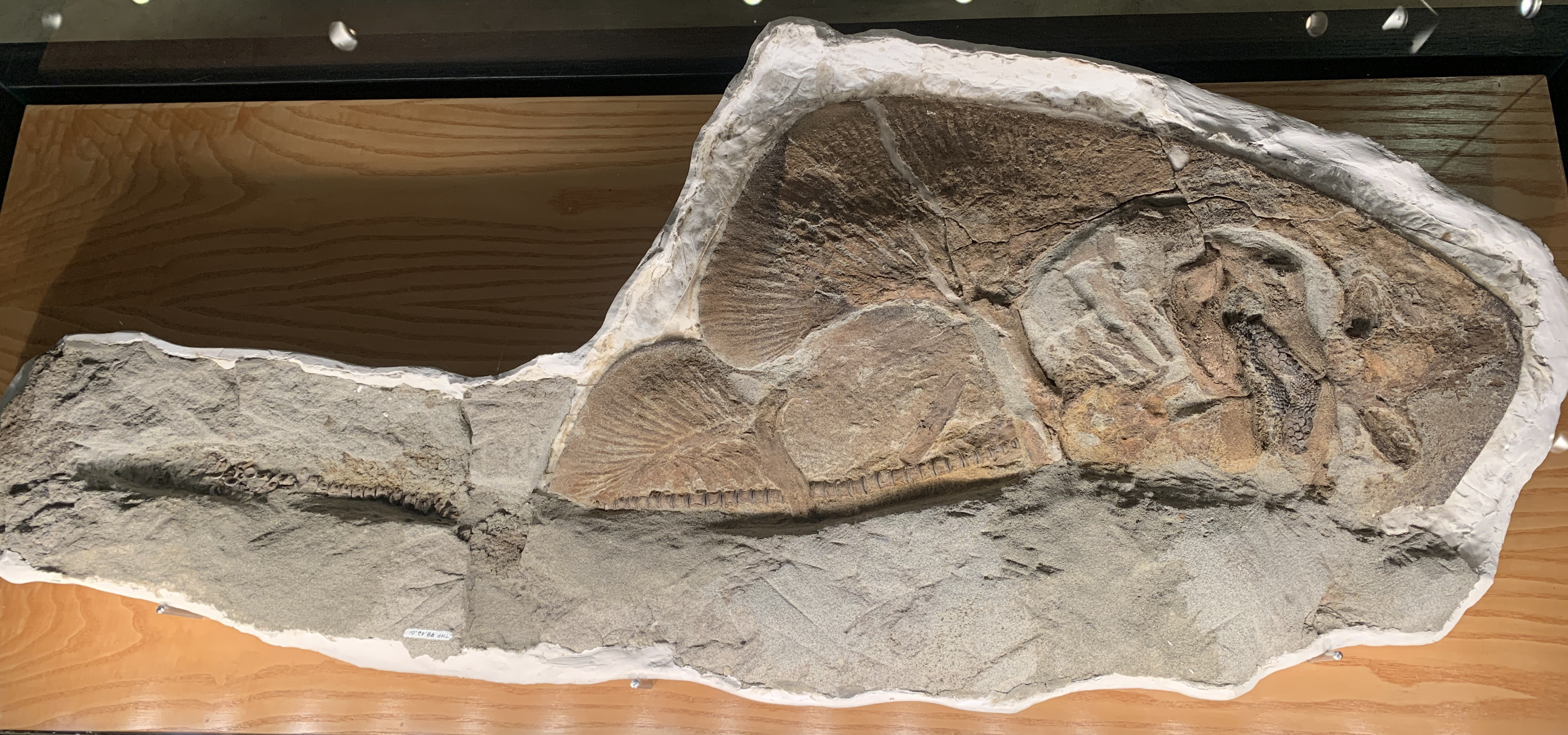
- Myledaphus bipartitus

Scientific classification
- Kingdom: Animalia
- Phylum: Chordata
- Class: Chondrichthyes
- Subclass: Elasmobranchii
- Order: Rhinopristiformes
- Family: Rhinobatidae
- Genus: †Myledaphus; Cope, 1876

Type species
- †Myledaphus bipartitus Cope, 1876

Other species
- †Myledaphus tritus Nessov in Nessov & Udovitschenko, 1986; †Myledaphus pustulosus Cook, Newbrey, Brinkman, & Kirkland, 2014; †Myledaphus araucanus Otero, 2019

= Myledaphus =

Myledaphus Temporal range: Turonian-Maastrichtian (possible Paleogene occurrences)

Extinct genus of cartilaginous fishes

Myledaphus is an extinct genus of guitarfish. It contains four valid species found in North America (M. bipartitus, M. pustulosus), South America (M. araucanus), and Central Asia (M. tritus). It is confirmed to have lived during the Late Cretaceous, with possible occurrences in the Paleocene and early Eocene. While the genus is mostly known from teeth, two partial skeletons of M. bipartitus have been found in the Dinosaur Park Formation of Alberta.

== Biology ==
Life restoration of M. bipartitus

Myledaphus remains have been found both in marine and fluvial (freshwater) deposits, suggesting it could tolerate a range of salinity. This genus was able to move into the North American continent due to an intercontinental seaway flood that happened later on in the cretaceous period. In the Hell Creek Formation, composed predominantly of floodplain and riverine deposits, Myledaphus teeth are very common, accounting for a significant fraction of vertebrate remains found in microsites.

Myledaphus has a durophagus dentition with blunt, polygonal-shaped (hexagonal to rhombic) teeth tessellated into a pavement suited for crushing and grinding hard-bodied prey. Their tooth shape are commonnly described as ray teeth. Many of their teeth show wear consistent with feeding on mollusks, which were common in the rivers of North America during the Late Cretaceous.

Myledaphus also have other traits aside from their teeth that can help identify them. Many of their fossils exhibit very similar shapes such as having "large pectoral fins that do not expand anterior to the eyes" but actually they serve to " form an angular disk that expands caudually".
