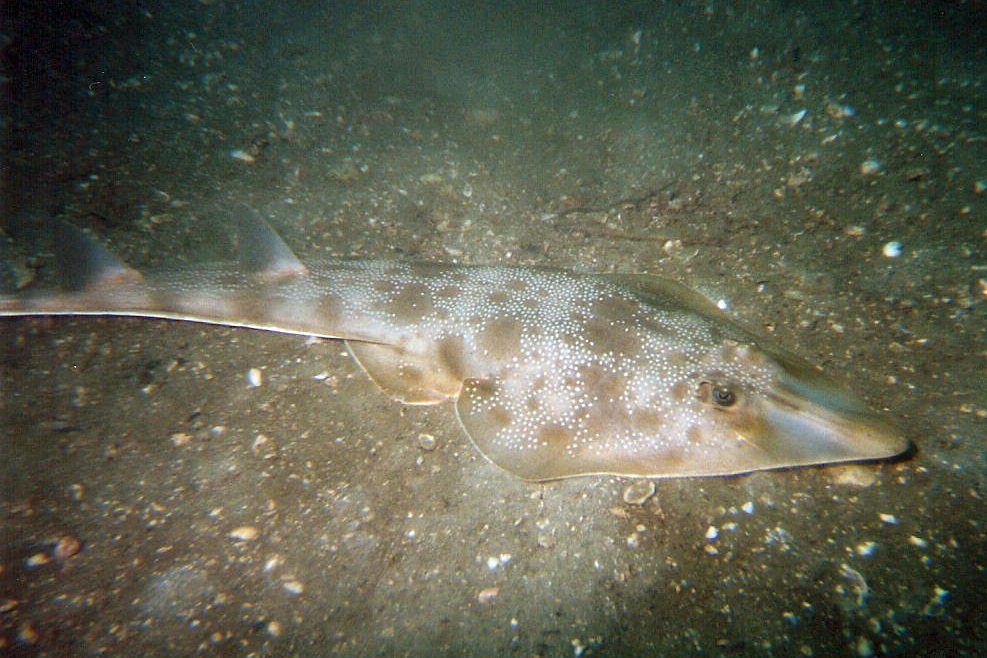

Conservation status
- Vulnerable (IUCN 3.1)

Scientific classification
- Kingdom: Animalia
- Phylum: Chordata
- Class: Chondrichthyes
- Subclass: Elasmobranchii
- Order: Rhinopristiformes
- Family: Rhinobatidae
- Genus: Pseudobatos
- Species: P. lentiginosus

Binomial name
- Pseudobatos lentiginosus (Garman, 1880)

Synonyms
- Rhinobatos lentiginosus Garman, 1880

= Pseudobatos lentiginosus =

Atlantic cartilaginous fish

Pseudobatos lentiginosus, the Atlantic guitarfish, or freckled guitarfish, is a species of skate in the family Rhinobatidae.

== Distribution ==
It lives in tropical and subtropical areas of the Atlantic Ocean from North Carolina to the northern part of the Gulf of Mexico. It can be found living in several countries, including Belize, Brazil, Mexico, the USA, Honduras and Nicaragua.

== Habitat ==
It inhabits shallow, warm, coastal waters at depths of 0–30 m (0–98 ft). It likes sandy, muddy and weedy bottoms where it bury itself in the seabed, often near reefs and shorelines where it can camouflage itself. It has also been found in brackish and freshwater habitats.

== Diet ==
These fish eat small fish, crustaceans and molluscs. They dig these up using their pointed snouts..

== Description ==
It looks like a cross between a shark and a ray and it is one of the smallest of all guitarfish species, only getting up to almost 76 cm (30 in). On its tubular body, it has dorsal and caudal fins in the back half. It also has a pectoral disc on its head. On the top of its body, it is grey and brown with white spots, while underneath it is whitish. It has a somewhat pointed snout that helps it dig up small animals on the seabed.

== Conservation status ==
The Atlantic guitarfish is listed as Vulnerable by the IUCN Red List and its population is decreasing. The threats that the species face are the use of it in the aquarium trade, oil and gas drilling and the development of touristic, urban, residential, commercial, industrial and recreational areas.
