= Bareback shovelnose ray =

Conservation status
- Data Deficient (IUCN 3.1)

Scientific classification
- Kingdom: Animalia
- Phylum: Chordata
- Class: Chondrichthyes
- Subclass: Elasmobranchii
- Order: Rhinopristiformes
- Family: Rhinobatidae
- Genus: Rhinobatos
- Species: R. nudidorsalis

Binomial name
- Rhinobatos nudidorsalis Last, Compagno & Nakaya, 2004

Species of cartilaginous fish

The bareback shovelnose ray (Rhinobatos nudidorsalis) or nakedback guitarfish, is a species of fish in the Rhinobatidae family. It is found in Seychelles and Mauritius. Its natural habitat is open seas.
