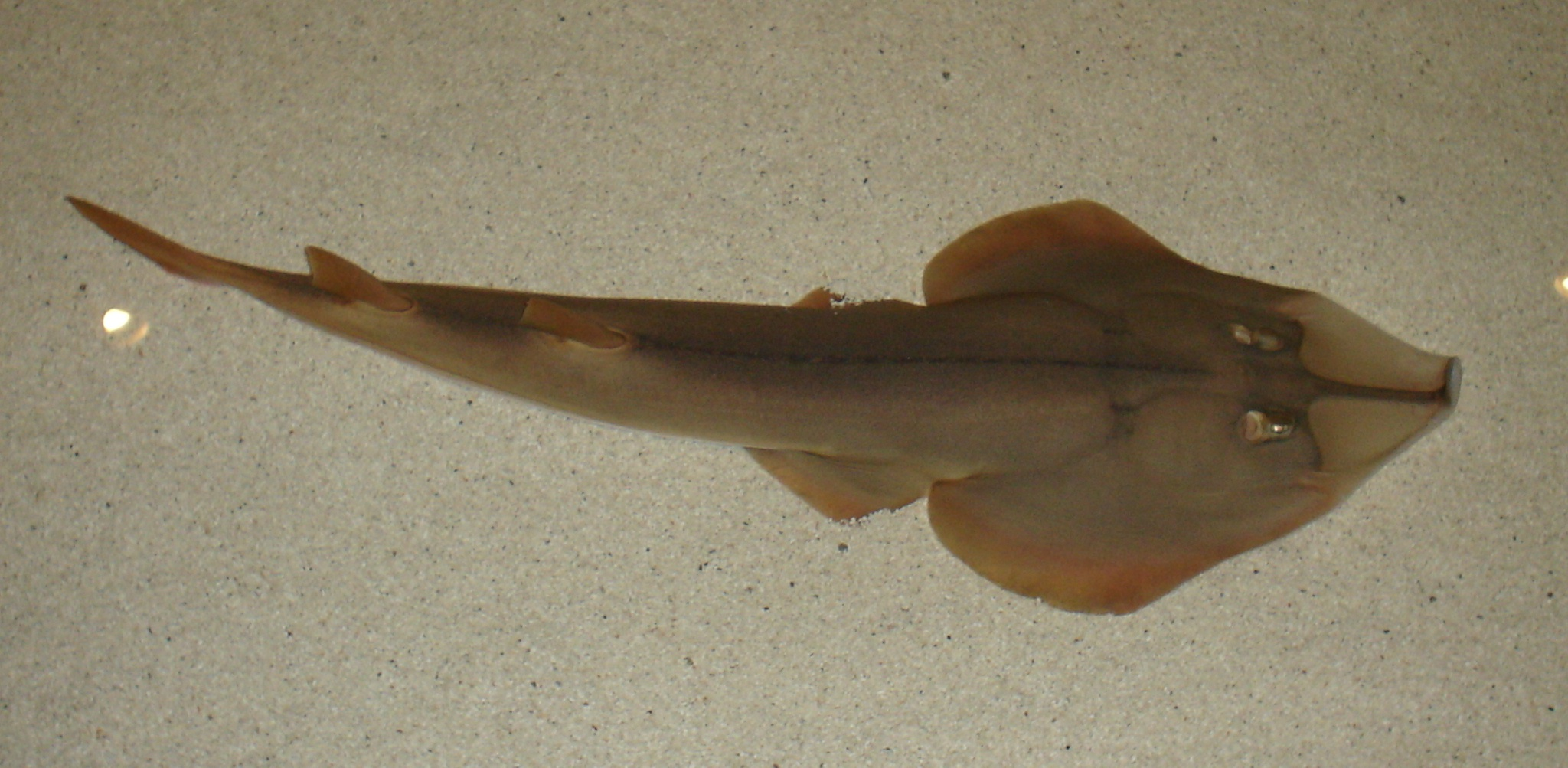
- Pseudobatos productus

Scientific classification
- Kingdom: Animalia
- Phylum: Chordata
- Class: Chondrichthyes
- Subclass: Elasmobranchii
- Order: Rhinopristiformes
- Family: Rhinobatidae
- Genus: Pseudobatos; Last, Seret, and Naylor, 2016

Type species
- Raja percellens Walbaum, 1792

Species
- 9, see text

= Pseudobatos =

Genus of cartilaginous fishes

Pseudobatos is a genus of fish in the Rhinobatidae family. Although its constituent species were previously assigned to Rhinobatos, recent authors treat it as distinct.

They are found in warmer coastal parts of the Americas, ranging from northern Chile to California (USA) on the Pacific side, and from northeastern Argentina to North Carolina (USA) on the Atlantic side. They are brownish or grayish above, and reach up to 70–170 cm (2.3–5.6 ft) depending on the exact species.

== Species ==
There are nine currently recognized species in this genus:

- Pseudobatos buthi K.M. Rutledge, 2019 (spadenose guitarfish)
- Pseudobatos glaucostigma (D. S. Jordan & C. H. Gilbert, 1883) (speckled guitarfish)
- Pseudobatos horkelii (J. P. Müller & Henle, 1841) (Brazilian guitarfish)
- Pseudobatos lentiginosus (Garman, 1880) (Atlantic guitarfish)
- Pseudobatos leucorhynchus (Günther, 1867) (whitesnout guitarfish)
- Pseudobatos percellens (Walbaum, 1792) (Chola guitarfish)
- Pseudobatos planiceps (Garman, 1880) (Pacific guitarfish)
- Pseudobatos prahli (Acero P & Franke, 1995) (Gorgona guitarfish)
- Pseudobatos productus (Ayres, 1854) (shovelnose guitarfish)
