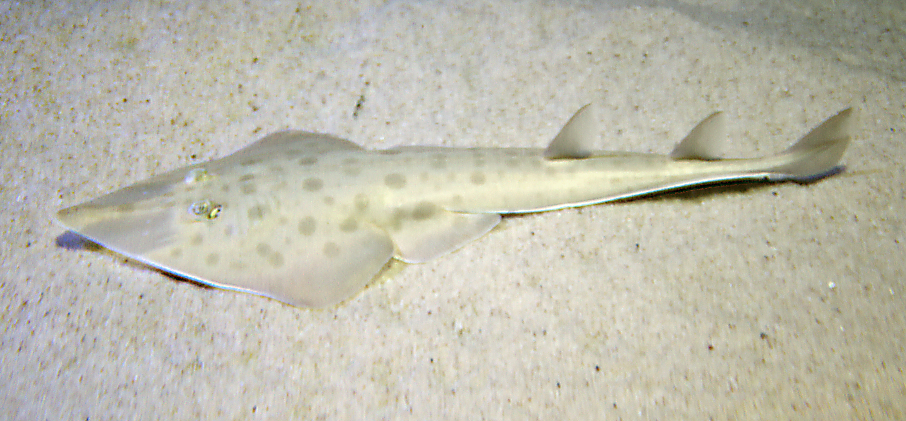

Conservation status
- Vulnerable (IUCN 3.1)

Scientific classification
- Kingdom: Animalia
- Phylum: Chordata
- Class: Chondrichthyes
- Subclass: Elasmobranchii
- Order: Rhinopristiformes
- Family: Rhinobatidae
- Genus: Acroteriobatus
- Species: A. annulatus

Binomial name
- Acroteriobatus annulatus (J. P. Müller & Henle, 1841)

Synonyms
- Rhinobatos annulatus

= Lesser guitarfish =

Species of cartilaginous fish

The lesser guitarfish or lesser sandshark (Acroteriobatus annulatus) is a species of fish in the Rhinobatidae family.

== Description ==
This sand shark grows up to 141 cm long. It has a flat, triangular snout with nearly translucent areas on either side. The upper part of the body is pale cream with dark rings surrounding dark spots. The underside is white. The dorsal fins are set well back on the tail.

== Distribution and habitat ==
This shark lives on sandy plains. It is found in Angola, Namibia, South Africa, and possibly Mozambique. Its natural habitats are shallow seas and estuarine waters.

== Conservation ==
This species is classified as vulnerable by the IUCN. It is threatened by habitat loss.
