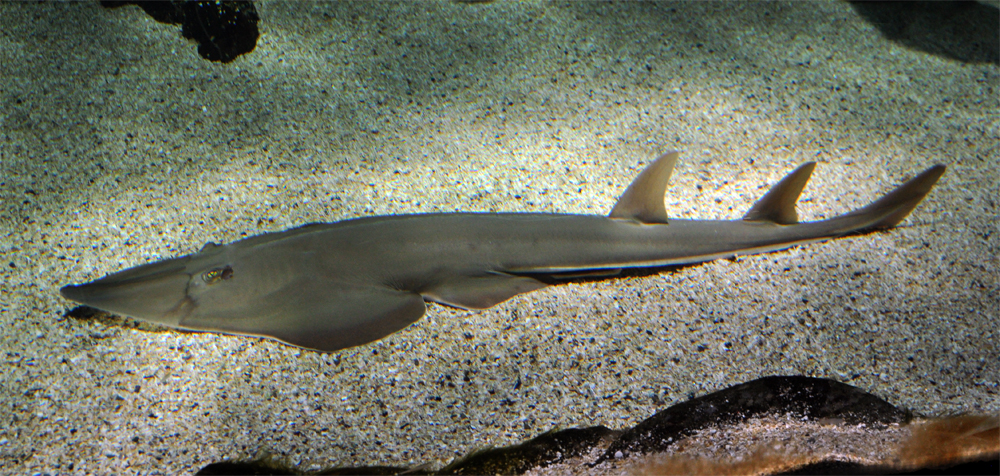
- Rhinobatos rhinobatos

Scientific classification
- Kingdom: Animalia
- Phylum: Chordata
- Class: Chondrichthyes
- Subclass: Elasmobranchii
- Order: Rhinopristiformes
- Family: Rhinobatidae
- Genus: Rhinobatos; H. F. Linck, 1790

= Rhinobatos =

Rhinobatos Temporal range: 150–0 Ma Tithonian to Present

Genus of cartilaginous fishes

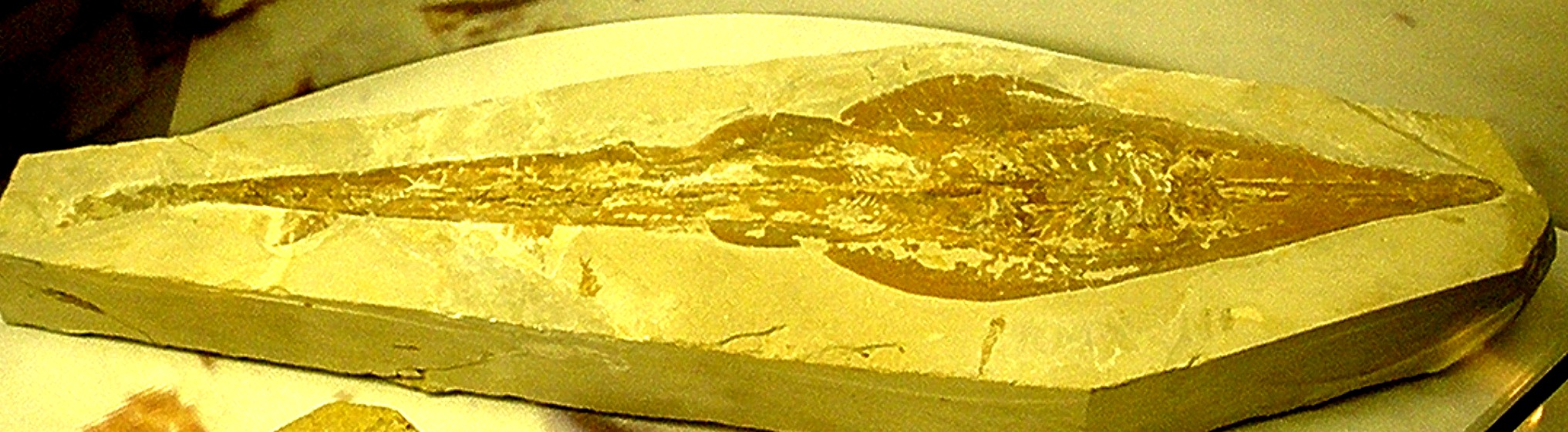
Rhinobatos hakelensis fossil

Rhinobatos (from Ancient Greek ῥίς (rhís), meaning "nose", and βάτος (bátos), meaning "ray") is a genus of fish in the Rhinobatidae family. Although previously used to encompass all guitarfishes, it was found to be polyphyletic, and recent authorities have transferred many species included in the genus to Acroteriobatus, Glaucostegus, and Pseudobatos.

== Species ==
The 20 currently recognized species in this genus are:

- Rhinobatos albomaculatus Norman, 1930 (White-spotted guitarfish)
- Rhinobatos annandalei Norman, 1926 (Annandale's guitarfish)
- Rhinobatos austini Ebert & Gon, 2017 (Austin's guitarfish)
- Rhinobatos borneensis Last, Séret & Naylor, 2016 (Borneo guitarfish)
- Rhinobatos formosensis Norman, 1926 (Taiwan guitarfish)
- Rhinobatos holcorhynchus Norman, 1922 (Slender guitarfish)
- Rhinobatos hynnicephalus J. Richardson, 1846 (Ringstreaked guitarfish)
- Rhinobatos irvinei Norman, 1931 (Spineback guitarfish)
- Rhinobatos jimbaranensis Last, W. T. White & Fahmi, 2006 (Jimbaran shovelnose ray)
- Rhinobatos lionotus Norman, 1926 (Smoothback guitarfish)
- Rhinobatos manai W. T. White, Last & Naylor, 2016 (Papuan guitarfish)
- Rhinobatos nudidorsalis Last, Compagno & Nakaya, 2004 (Bareback shovelnose ray)
- Rhinobatos penggali Last, W. T. White & Fahmi, 2006 (Indonesian shovelnose ray)
- Rhinobatos punctifer Compagno & J. E. Randall, 1987 (Spotted guitarfish)
- Rhinobatos ranongensis Last, Séret & Naylor, 2019 (Ranong guitarfish)
- Rhinobatos rhinobatos Linnaeus, 1758 (Common guitarfish)
- Rhinobatos sainsburyi Last, 2004 (Goldeneye shovelnose ray)
- Rhinobatos schlegelii J. P. Müller & Henle, 1841 (Brown guitarfish)
- Rhinobatos thouiniana (Shaw, 1804) (Shaw's shovelnose guitarfish)
- Rhinobatos whitei Last, Corrigan & Naylor, 2014 (Philippine guitarfish)

== Extinct species ==
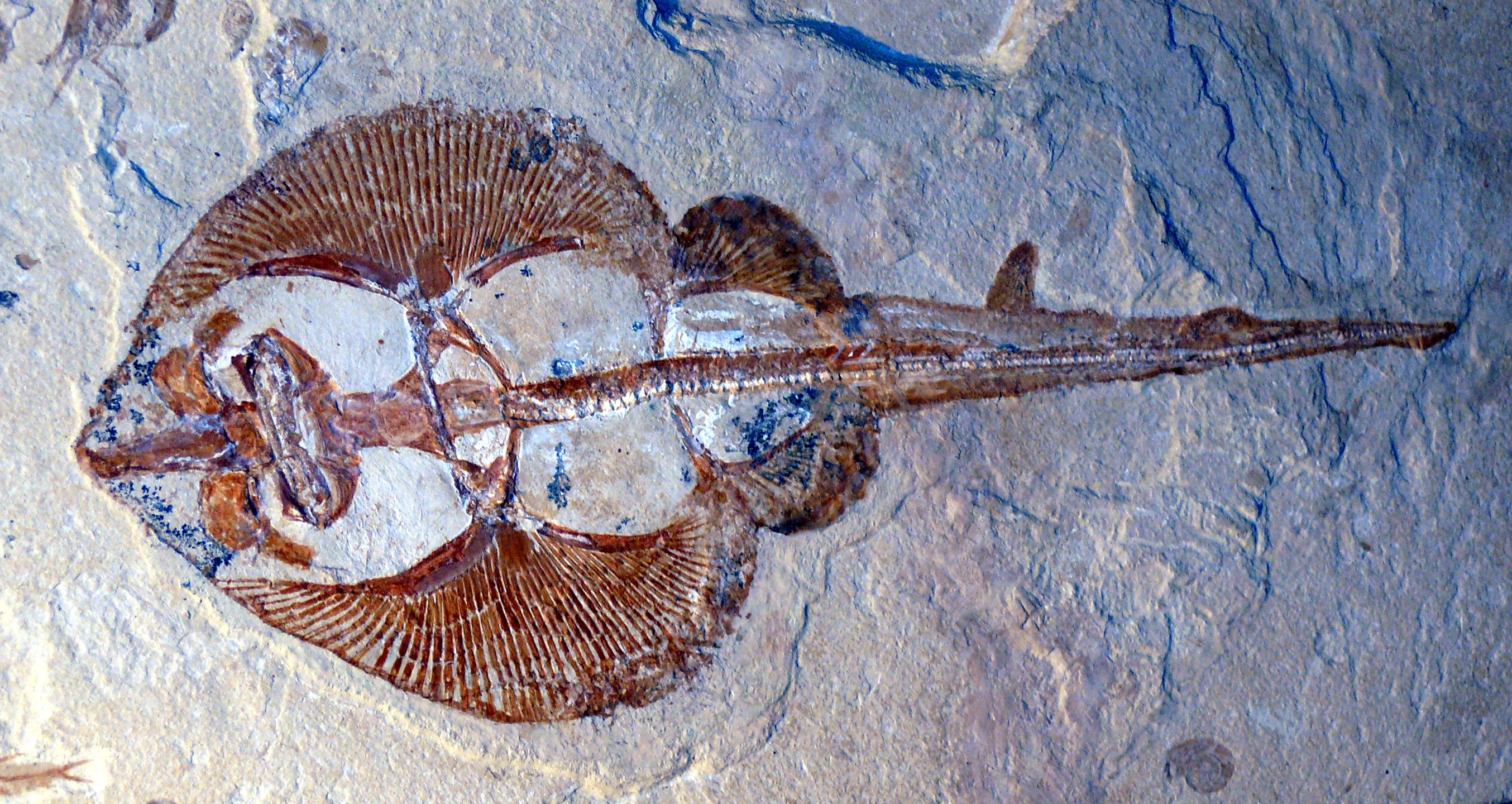
Fossil of Rhinobatos whitfieldi

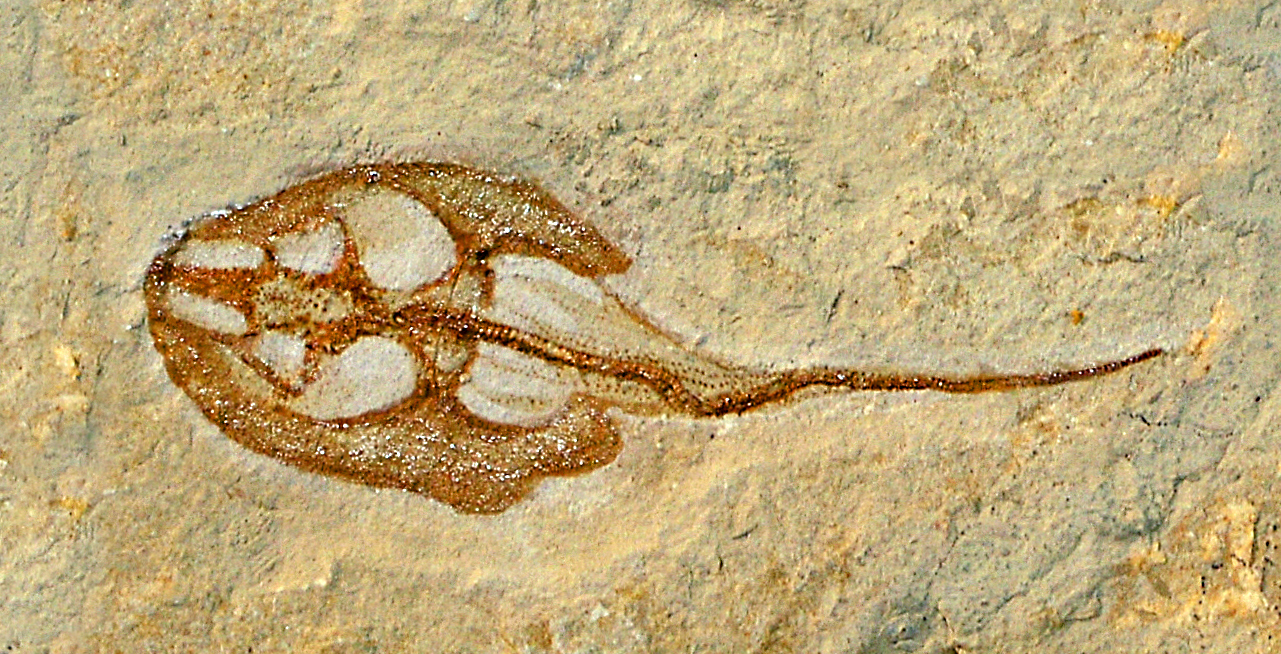
Fossil of Rhinobatos hakelensis

Species within this genus include:

- †Rhinobatos bruxelliensis Jaekel 1894
- †Rhinobatos casieri Herman 1975
- †Rhinobatos grandis Davis 1887
- †Rhinobatos hakelensis Capetta 1980
- †Rhinobatos incertus Cappetta 1973
- †Rhinobatos intermedius Davis 1887
- †Rhinobatos latus Davis 1887
- †Rhinobatos maronita Pictet and Humbert 1866
- †Rhinobatos primarmatus Woodward 1889
- †Rhinobatos sahnii Sahni and Mehrotra 1981
- †Rhinobatos steurbauti Cappetta and Nolf 1981
- †Rhinobatos tenuirostris Davis 1887
- †Rhinobatos whitfieldi Hay 1903

†Rhinobatos beurleni Silva Santos 1968 moved into its own genus, Iansan.

== Fossil record ==
These fishes lived from the Tithonian age to Present (from 150 to 0 million years ago). Fossils have been found in Brazil, Europe, Africa, Jordan, Syria, Saudi Arabia, India and United States.

== Gallery ==
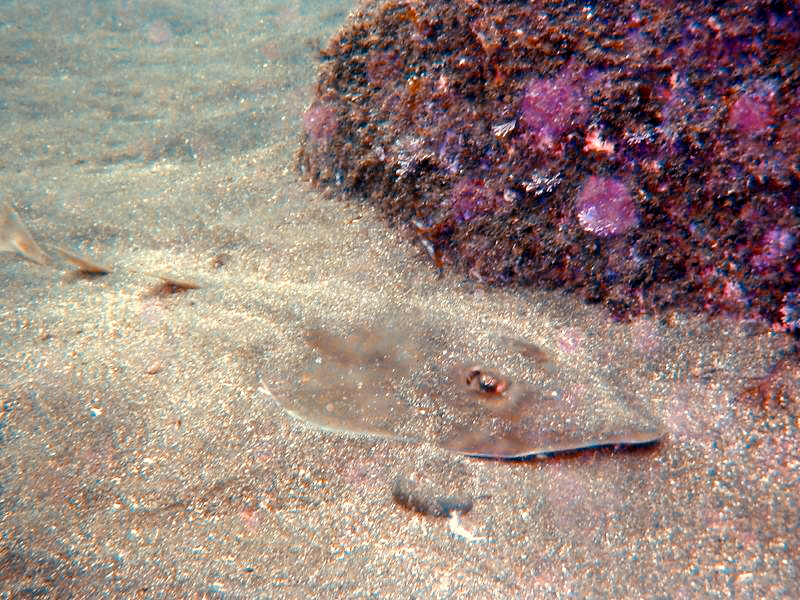
Rhinobatos hynnicephalus

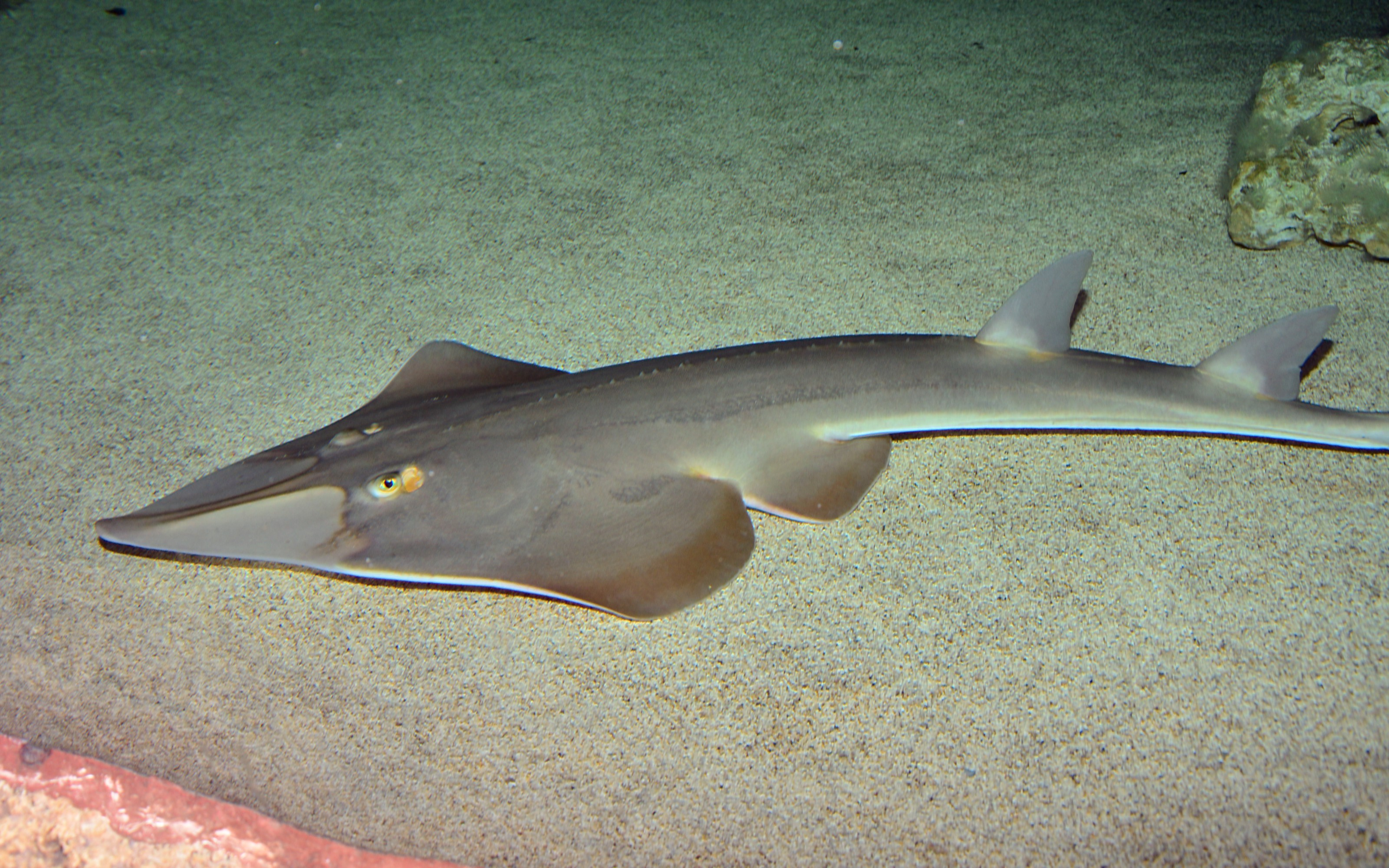
Rhinobatos rhinobatos

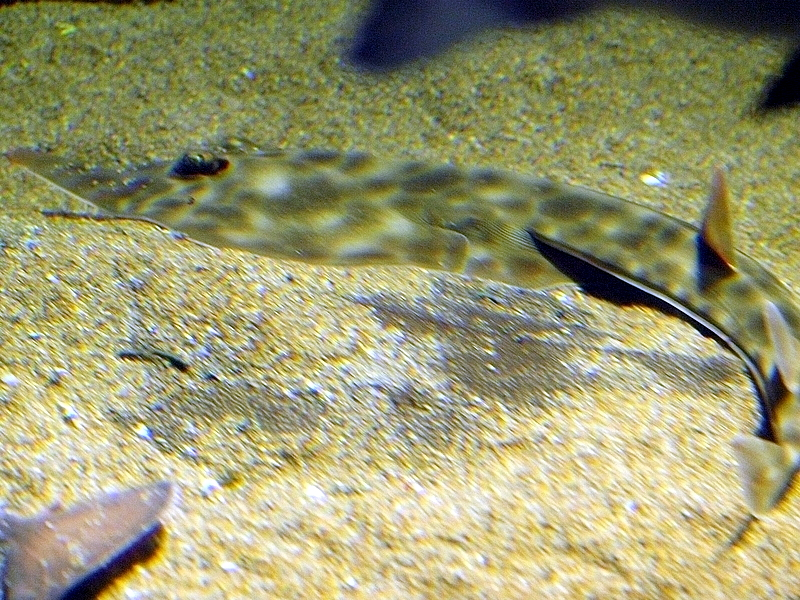
Rhinobatos schlegelii

== See also ==
- List of prehistoric cartilaginous fish genera
