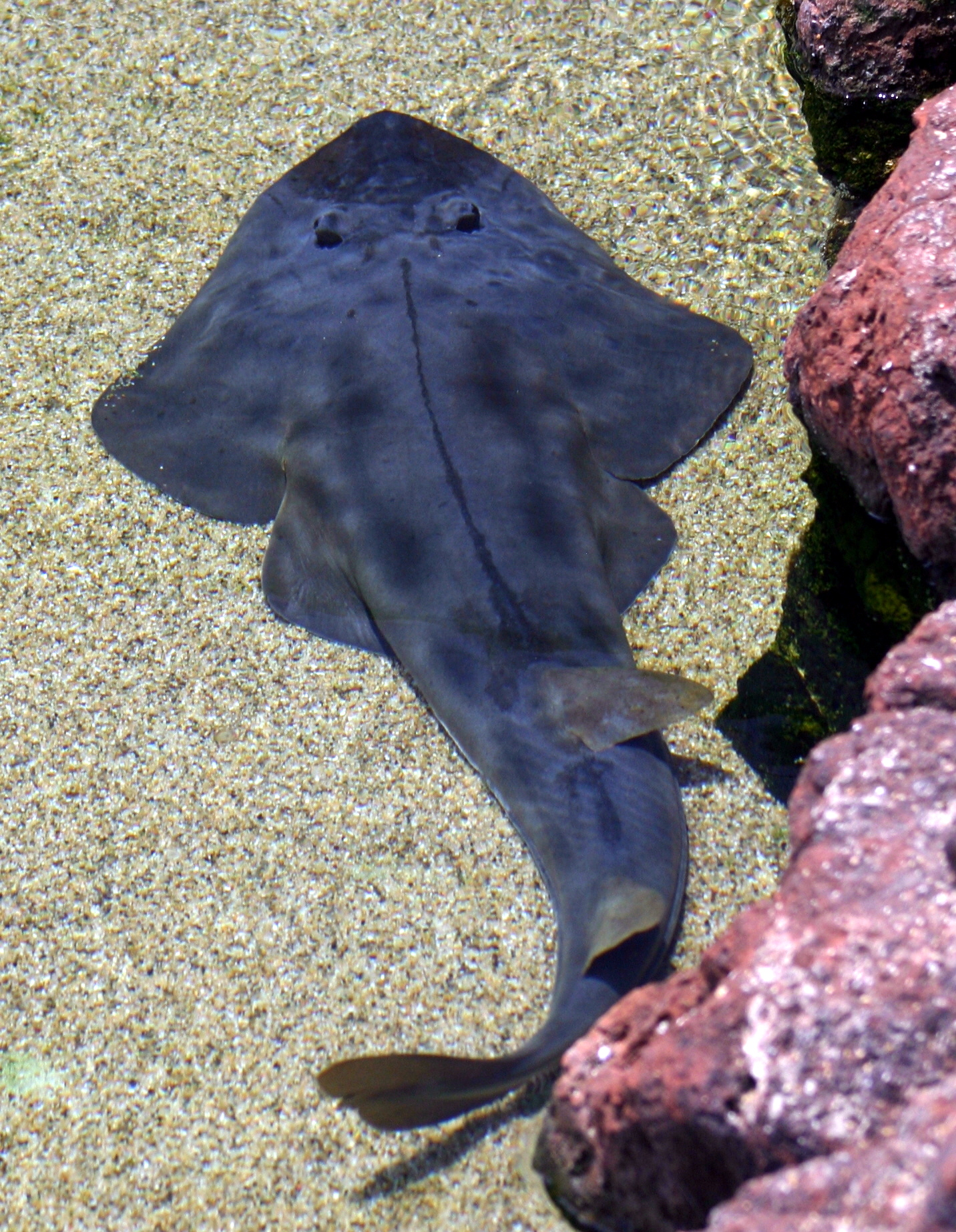
- Shovelnose guitarfish, Pseudobatos productus

Scientific classification
- Kingdom: Animalia
- Phylum: Chordata
- Class: Chondrichthyes
- Subclass: Elasmobranchii
- Order: Rhinopristiformes
- Family: Rhinobatidae; J. P. Müller & Henle, 1837

Genera
- Acroteriobatus; Pseudobatos; Rhinobatos; †Myledaphus

= Guitarfish =

Guitarfish Temporal range: Upper Jurassic–Recent

Family of cartilaginous fishes

The guitarfish, also referred to as shovelnose rays, are a family, Rhinobatidae, of rays. The guitarfish are known for an elongated body with a flattened head and trunk and small, ray-like wings. The combined range of the various species is tropical, subtropical, and warm temperate waters worldwide.

== Names ==
In Australia and New Zealand, guitarfish are commonly referred to as shovelnose rays or shovelnose sharks.

== Description ==
Guitarfish have a body form intermediate between those of sharks and rays. The tail has a typical shark-like form, but in many species, the head has a triangular, or guitar-like shape, rather than the disc-shape formed by fusion with the pectoral fins found in other rays.

== Reproduction ==
Guitarfish can be ovoviviparous; the embryo matures inside an egg within the mother until it is ready to hatch. This is typical of rays.

== Habitat ==
Guitarfish are bottom feeders that bury themselves in mud or sand and eat worms, crabs, and clams. Some can tolerate salt, fresh, and brackish water. They generally live close to the beach/coastline or in estuaries.

Per the myDiveguide.com database, the Maldives is the area with the most recorded guitarfish encounters, mainly in the Northern Atolls. The dive site with the most recorded guitarfish encounters worldwide is Maroshi Thila near Shaviyani Atoll.

== Evolution ==
Rays, including guitarfish, belong to the ancient lineage of cartilaginous fishes. Fossil denticles (tooth-like scales in the skin) resembling that of today's chondrichthyans date at least as far back as the Ordovician, with the oldest unambiguous fossils of cartilaginous fish dating from the middle Devonian. A clade within this diverse family, the Neoselachii, emerged by the Triassic, with the best-understood neoselachian fossils dating from the Jurassic. This clade is represented today by sharks, sawfish, rays and skates.

== Classification ==
There are a number of issues in the taxonomy of Rhinobatidae, and many fish that were once in this family have been moved to their own families. Nelson's 2006 Fishes of the World recognized four genera in this family: Aptychotrema, Rhinobatos, Trygonorrhina, and Zapteryx. Of these, Aptychotrema, Trygonorrhina, and Zapteryx have been reclassified in the family Trygonorrhinidae. Several other taxa once placed in the Rhinobatidae, such as Platyrhinoidis and Rhina, have also been moved to their own families. Recently, the genus Glaucostegus has again become recognized as distinct from Rhinobatos, and now comprises its own family, Glaucostegidae.

Rhinobatos has been split in three genera based on genetic and morphological considerations: Rhinobatos, Acroteriobatus and Pseudobatos. Tarsistes is dubious and may be a synonym of Pseudobatos, and other genera formerly included in Rhinobatidae have been moved to Glaucostegidae, Rhinidae and Trygonorrhinidae.

A 2021 re-evaluation of almost complete and articulated material from the Konservat-Lagerstätten of Bolca in Italy suggested that †"Rhinobatos" dezignii and †"Rhinobatos" primaevus should be excluded from Rhinobatos and assigned to the new genera †Pseudorhinobatos and †Eorhinobatos, respectively.

- Genus Acroteriobatus Giltay, 1928
  - Acroteriobatus andysabini (2021) (Malagasy blue-spotted guitarfish)
  - Acroteriobatus annulatus (J. P. Müller & Henle, 1841) (Lesser guitarfish)
  - Acroteriobatus blochii (J. P. Müller & Henle, 1841) (Bluntnose guitarfish)
  - Acroteriobatus leucospilus (Norman, 1926) (Grayspotted guitarfish)
  - Acroteriobatus ocellatus (Norman, 1926) (Speckled guitarfish)
  - Acroteriobatus omanensis Last, Hendeson & Naylor, 2016 (Oman guitarfish)
  - Acroteriobatus salalah (J. E. Randall & Compagno, 1995) (Salalah guitarfish)
  - Acroteriobatus stehmanni (2021) (Socotra blue-spotted guitarfish)
  - Acroteriobatus variegatus (Nair & Lal Mohan, 1973) (Stripenose guitarfish)
  - Acroteriobatus zanzibarensis (Norman, 1926) (Zanzibar guitarfish)
- Genus †Eorhinobatos Marramà et al., 2021
  - †Eorhinobatos primaevus (De Zigno, 1874)
- Genus Pseudobatos Last, Seret, and Naylor, 2016
  - Pseudobatos buthi K.M. Rutledge, 2019 (Spadenose guitarfish)
  - Pseudobatos glaucostigmus (D. S. Jordan & C. H. Gilbert, 1883) (Speckled guitarfish)
  - Pseudobatos horkelii (J. P. Müller & Henle, 1841) (Brazilian guitarfish)
  - Pseudobatos lentiginosus (Garman, 1880) (Atlantic guitarfish)
  - Pseudobatos leucorhynchus (Günther, 1867) (Whitesnout guitarfish)
  - Pseudobatos percellens (Walbaum, 1792) (Chola guitarfish)
  - Pseudobatos planiceps (Garman, 1880) (Pacific guitarfish)
  - Pseudobatos prahli (Acero P & Franke, 1995) (Gorgona guitarfish)
  - Pseudobatos productus (Ayres, 1854) (Shovelnose guitarfish) Marramà
- Genus †Pseudorhinobatos Marramà et al., 2021
  - †Pseudorhinobatos dezignii (Heckel, 1853)
- Genus Rhinobatos H. F. Linck, 1790
  - Rhinobatos albomaculatus Norman, 1930 (white-spotted guitarfish)
  - Rhinobatos annandalei Norman, 1926 (Annandale's guitarfish)
  - Rhinobatos borneensis Last, Séret & Naylor, 2016 (Borneo guitarfish)
  - Rhinobatos holcorhynchus Norman, 1922 (slender guitarfish)
  - Rhinobatos hynnicephalus J. Richardson, 1846 (Ringstreaked guitarfish)
  - Rhinobatos irvinei Norman, 1931 (spineback guitarfish)
  - Rhinobatos jimbaranensis Last, W. T. White & Fahmi, 2006 (Jimbaran shovelnose ray)
  - Rhinobatos lionotus Norman, 1926 (smoothback guitarfish)
  - Rhinobatos nudidorsalis Last, Compagno & Nakaya, 2004 (Bareback shovelnose ray)
  - Rhinobatos penggali Last, W. T. White & Fahmi, 2006 (Indonesian shovelnose ray)
  - Rhinobatos punctifer Compagno & Randall, 1987 (spotted guitarfish)
  - Rhinobatos rhinobatos Linnaeus, 1758 (common guitarfish)
  - Rhinobatos sainsburyi Last, 2004 (goldeneye shovelnose ray)
  - Rhinobatos schlegelii J. P. Müller & Henle, 1841 (brown guitarfish)
  - Rhinobatos whitei Last, Corrigan & Naylor, 2014 (Philippine guitarfish)
- Genus †Myledaphus Cope, 1876
  - †Myledaphus araucanus Otero, 2019
  - †Myledaphus bipartitus Cope, 1876

== Conservation ==
Illegal trade and fishing of guitarfish, especially the critically endangered Pseudobatos horkelii, for elasmobranch products poses one of the largest threats to this ancient group of animals.

== See also ==
- Angelshark
