= List of threatened rays =

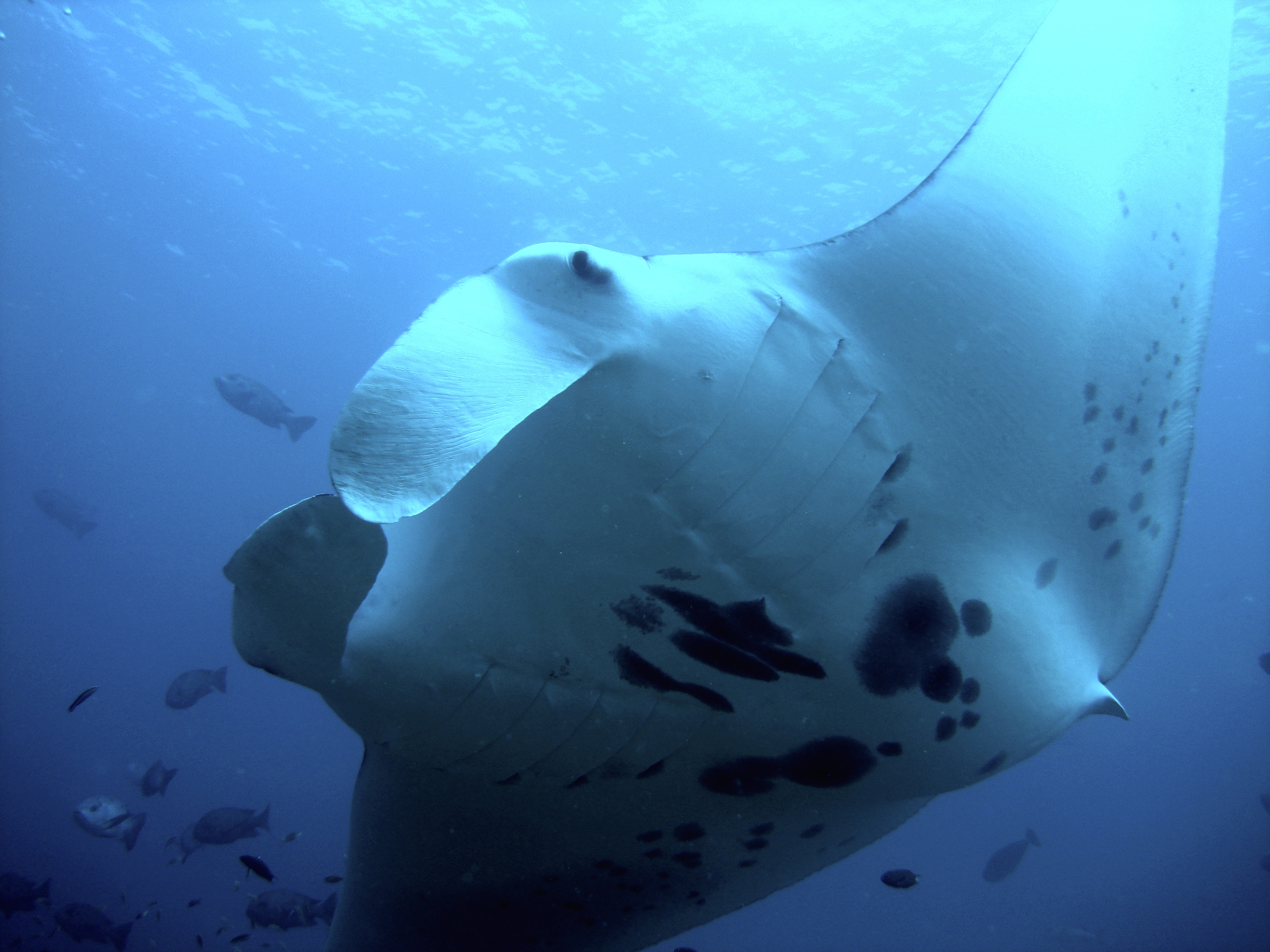
Manta rays include the largest rays in the world, and have been targeted by fisheries to the point where they have become vulnerable or endangered. In 2013 they were listed as CITES Appendix II species, which gives them some international protection.

The market for shark and ray products is first and foremost a luxury one: The gill plates, in the case of manta rays, are used in China for a tonic soup that has become fashionable because of perceived medicinal properties, even though it is not in the traditional Chinese pharmacopoeia. This is a recent trend and has caused a population loss of up to 86% in the last six to eight years.

— WWF 2013

Threatened rays are those vulnerable to endangerment (extinction) in the near future. The International Union for Conservation of Nature (IUCN) ranks threatened species in three categories:

Vulnerable species
Endangered species
Critically endangered species

The term threatened strictly refers to these three categories (critically endangered, endangered and vulnerable), while vulnerable is used to refer to the least at risk of these categories. The terms can be used somewhat interchangeably, as all vulnerable species are threatened, all endangered species are vulnerable and threatened, and all critically endangered species are endangered, vulnerable and threatened. Threatened species are also referred to as a red-listed species, as they are listed in the IUCN Red List of Threatened Species.

Together rays and sharks make up the class of modern cartilaginous fishes. Modern fish are either cartilaginous or bony. Cartilaginous fishes have skeletons made of cartilage while bony fishes have skeletons made of bone. Because rays and sharks are closely related, they are often studied together. In 2010 a global IUCN study of vertebrates found that of 1,044 cartilaginous (ray and shark) species examined, 345 or 33% were threatened with extinction.

There are four orders of rays: stingrays, skates, electric rays and sawfishes. Like sharks, rays are relatively long living and thrive in stable populations. They are K-strategists which grow slowly, mature late sexually and produce few offspring. They cannot recover as rapidly as many faster growing fish can if their populations are depleted. As with sharks, rays are increasingly becoming vulnerable because of commercial and recreational fishing pressures, the impact of non-ray fisheries on the seabed and ray prey species, and other habitat alterations such as damage and loss from coastal development and marine pollution. Most particularly, the continuing decline of threatened rays and sharks is the consequence of unregulated fishing, as illustrated by a recent international survey which listed only 38 species of skates and rays still subsisting in the highly impacted Mediterranean Sea.

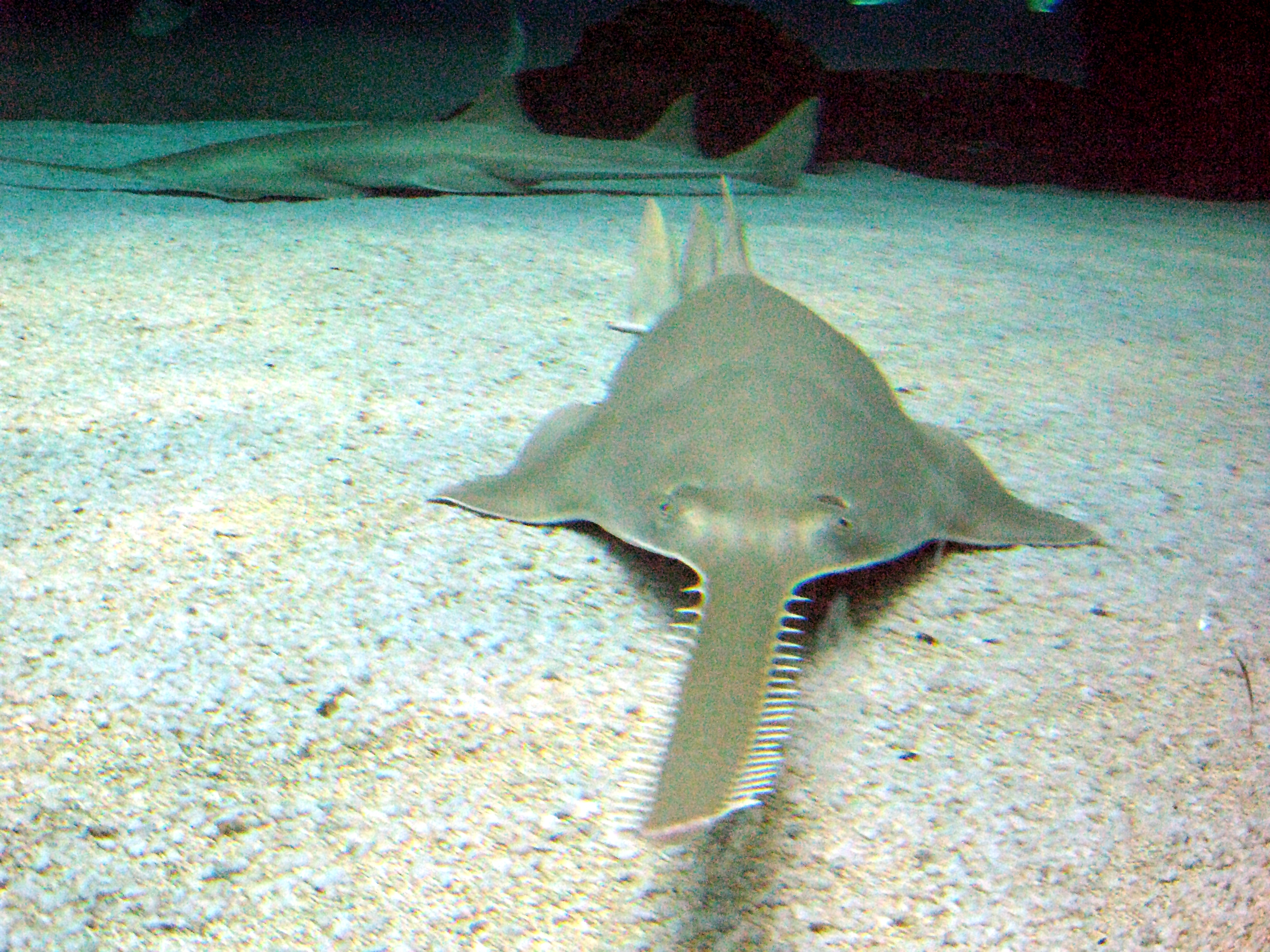
Sawfish are a family of rays which have a long rostrum resembling a saw. All species in the family are either endangered or critically endangered

Manta rays are largest rays in the world, with wingspans reaching 7 metres. They have one of the highest brain-to-body mass ratios of all fish. Manta populations suffer when they are caught as bycatch by fishermen fishing for other species, but fisheries which target manta rays are even more harmful. Manta rays use their gills to filter plankton from the sea. Demand for their dried gill rakers, cartilaginous structures protecting the gills, has been growing in traditional Chinese medicine practices. The market is "bogus" since dried manta gills have never been used historically in Chinese medicine, and there is no evidence that the gills have any medicinal value. The flesh is edible and is consumed in some countries, but is tough and unattractive compared to other fish. To fill the growing demand in Asia for gill rakers, targeted fisheries have developed in other parts of the world, including Sri Lanka, Indonesia, West Africa and Central and South America. Each year, thousands of manta rays, primarily the giant manta ray, are being caught and killed purely for their gill rakers. A fisheries study in Sri Lanka estimated that over a thousand of these were being sold in the country's fish markets each year.

In 2011, manta rays became strictly protected in international waters thanks to their recent inclusion in the Convention on Migratory Species of Wild Animals. The CMS is an international treaty organization concerned with conserving migratory species and habitats on a global scale. Although individual nations were already protecting manta rays, the fish often migrate through unregulated waters, putting them at increased risk from overfishing. In 2013, the Convention on International Trade in Endangered Species (CITES) listed both species of manta rays as CITES Appendix II species. This means that the international trade of manta rays will now be monitored and regulated.

Sawfish are a less well known family of rays which have a long rostrum resembling a saw. Some species can reach 7 metres or 23 feet in length. All species of sawfish are either endangered or critically endangered as a result of habitat destruction and overfishing. Their young stay close to shore, and are particularly affected by coastal developments. Because their rostrum is easily entangled, sawfishes can easily become bycatch in fishing nets. They are also exploited for the novelty value of their rostrum, their fins are eaten as a delicacy in China, and their liver oil used as a food supplement. While arguing for a global ban on international commerce in 2007, a representative from the National Museums of Kenya stated, "Only the meat is consumed locally; and artisanal fishermen can retire after catching one sawfish due to the high value of a single rostrum, up to $1,450." In 2013 CITES uplisted the largetooth sawfish to Appendix I. This is CITES highest protection level, and means that all international trade of the species is banned.

According to a 2021 study published in the journal Nature, relative fishing pressure in the oceans has increased by a factor of 18 since 1970. This overfishing has resulted in the number of oceanic sharks and rays declining globally by 71%, and has increased the global extinction risk to the point where three-quarters of these species are now threatened with extinction. Precautionary science-based catch limits and strict prohibitions are now needed urgently if population collapse is to be avoided, if the disruption of ecological functions is to be averted, and if a start is to be made on rebuilding global fisheries.

== List ==
Order	Image	Scientific name	Common name	Population trend	IUCN status	Fish Base	FAO	Comment
Stingray		Aetobatus flagellum	Longheaded eagle ray	decreasing	Endangered			
Stingray		Aetomylaeus maculatus	Mottled eagle ray	decreasing	Endangered			
Stingray		Aetomylaeus nichofii	Banded eagle ray	decreasing	Vulnerable			
Stingray		Aetomylaeus vespertilio	Ornate eagle ray	decreasing	Endangered			
Skate		Amblyraja radiata	Thorny skate	decreasing	Vulnerable			
Sawfish		Anoxypristis cuspidata	Knifetooth sawfish	decreasing	Endangered			
Stingray		Aptychotrema timorensis	Spotted shovelnose ray	unknown	Vulnerable			
Skate		Atlantoraja castelnaui	Spotback skate	decreasing	Endangered			
Skate		Atlantoraja cyclophora	Eyespot skate	decreasing	Vulnerable			
Skate		Atlantoraja platana	La Plata skate	decreasing	Vulnerable			
Skate		Bathyraja griseocauda	Graytail skate	decreasing	Endangered			
Electric ray		Benthobatis kreffti	Brazilian blind electric ray	unknown	Vulnerable			
Stingray		Dasyatis colarensis	Colares stingray	unknown	Vulnerable			
Stingray		Dasyatis fluviorum	Estuary stingaree	decreasing	Vulnerable			
Stingray		Dasyatis garouaensis	Smooth freshwater stingray	decreasing	Vulnerable			freshwater
Stingray		Dasyatis laosensis	Mekong freshwater stingray	decreasing	Endangered			freshwater
Stingray		Dasyatis margarita	Daisy stingray	decreasing	Endangered			
Stingray		Dasyatis ukpam	Daisy stingray	unknown	Endangered			freshwater
Electric ray		Diplobatis colombiensis	Colombian electric ray	unknown	Vulnerable			
Electric ray		Diplobatis guamachensis	Brownband numbfish	unknown	Vulnerable			
Electric ray		Diplobatis ommata	Ocellated electric ray	unknown	Vulnerable			
Electric ray		Diplobatis pictus	Variegated electric ray	unknown	Vulnerable			
Skate		Dipturus australis	Sydney skate	unknown	Vulnerable			
Skate		Dipturus batis	Blue skate	decreasing	Critically endangered			
Skate		Dipturus crosnieri	Madagascar skate	unknown	Vulnerable			
Skate		Dipturus laevis	Barndoor skate	stable	Endangered			
Skate		Dipturus mennii	South Brazilian skate	unknown	Vulnerable			
Skate		Dipturus trachydermus	Roughskin skate	decreasing	Vulnerable			
Skate		Glaucostegus granulatus	Sharpnose guitarfish	decreasing	Vulnerable			
Skate		Glaucostegus thouin	Clubnose guitarfish	unknown	Vulnerable			
Skate		Glaucostegus typus	Common shovelnose ray	decreasing	Critically Endangered			
Skate		Gurgesiella dorsalifera	Onefin skate	decreasing	Vulnerable			
Stingray		Gymnura altavela	Spiny butterfly ray	decreasing	Vulnerable			
Stingray		Gymnura zonura	Zonetail butterfly ray	decreasing	Vulnerable			
Electric ray		Heteronarce garmani	Natal electric ray	unknown	Vulnerable			
Stingray		Himantura gerrardi	Whitespotted whipray	unknown	Vulnerable			freshwater
Stingray		Himantura hortlei	Hortle's whipray	decreasing	Vulnerable			freshwater
Stingray		Himantura kittipongi	Roughback whipray	unknown	Endangered			freshwater
Stingray		Himantura leoparda	Leopard whipray	decreasing	Vulnerable			freshwater
Stingray		Himantura lobistoma	Tubemouth whipray	decreasing	Vulnerable			freshwater
Stingray		Himantura oxyrhyncha	Longnose marbled whipray	unknown	Endangered			freshwater
Stingray		Himantura pastinacoides	Round whipray	decreasing	Vulnerable			freshwater
Stingray		Urogymnus polylepis	Giant freshwater stingray	decreasing	Endangered			freshwater
Stingray		Himantura signifer	White-edge freshwater whipray	unknown	Endangered			freshwater
Stingray		Himantura uarnacoides	Bleeker's whipray	decreasing	Vulnerable			freshwater
Stingray		Himantura uarnak	Reticulate whipray	decreasing	Vulnerable			
Stingray		Himantura undulata	Bleeker's variegated whipray	decreasing	Vulnerable			
Skate		Leucoraja circularis	Sandy ray	unknown	Vulnerable			
Skate		Leucoraja melitensis	Maltese skate	decreasing	Critically endangered			
Skate		Leucoraja ocellata	Winter skate	decreasing	Endangered			
Stingray		Myliobatis hamlyni	Purple eagle ray	decreasing	Endangered			
Skate		Malacoraja senta	Smooth skate	decreasing	Endangered			
Stingray		Manta alfredi	Reef manta ray	decreasing	Vulnerable			
Stingray		Manta birostris	Giant manta ray	decreasing	Endangered			
Stingray		Mobula mobular	Giant devil ray	decreasing	Endangered			
Stingray		Mobula rochebrunei	Lesser Guinean devil ray	unknown	Endangered			
Electric ray		Narcine brevilabiata	Shortlip electric ray	unknown	Vulnerable			
Electric ray		Narke japonica	Japanese sleeper ray	unknown	Vulnerable			
Stingray		Pastinachus solocirostris	Roughnose stingray	unknown	Endangered			
Stingray		Platyrhina sinensis	Fanray	unknown	Vulnerable			
Sawfish		Pristis clavata	Queensland sawfish	decreasing	Critically endangered			
Sawfish		Pristis pectinata	Smalltooth sawfish	decreasing	Critically endangered			
Sawfish		Pristis pristis	Common sawfish	decreasing	Critically endangered			
Sawfish		Pristis zijsron	Narrowsnout sawfish	decreasing	Critically endangered			
Skate		Raja pulchra	Mottled skate	decreasing	Vulnerable			
Skate		Raja undulata	Undulate ray	decreasing	Endangered			
Sawfish		Rhina ancylostoma	Bowmouth guitarfish	decreasing	Critically endangered			
Sawfish		Rhinobatos albomaculatus	White-spotted guitarfish	decreasing	Vulnerable			
Sawfish		Rhinobatos cemiculus	Blackchin guitarfish	decreasing	Critically Endangered			
Sawfish		Rhinobatos formosensis	Taiwan guitarfish	decreasing	Critically Endangered			
Sawfish		Rhinobatos horkelii	Brazilian guitarfish	decreasing	Critically endangered			
Sawfish		Rhinobatos irvinei	Spineback guitarfish	decreasing	Vulnerable			
Sawfish		Rhinobatos jimbaranensis	Jimbaran shovelnose ray	decreasing	Vulnerable			
Sawfish		Rhinobatos obtusus	Widenose guitarfish	decreasing	Vulnerable			
Sawfish		Rhinobatos penggali	Indonesian shovelnose ray	decreasing	Vulnerable			
Sawfish		Rhinobatos rhinobatos	Common guitarfish	decreasing	Endangered			
Stingray		Rhinoptera brasiliensis	Brazilian cownose ray	decreasing	Endangered			
Stingray		Rhinoptera javanica	Javanese cownose ray	unknown	Vulnerable			
Skate		Rhinoraja albomaculata	White-dotted skate	unknown	Vulnerable			
Sawfish		Rhynchobatus australiae	White-spotted guitarfish	decreasing	Vulnerable			
Sawfish		Rhynchobatus djiddensis	Giant guitarfish	decreasing	Vulnerable			
Sawfish		Rhynchobatus laevis	Smoothnose wedgefish	unknown	Vulnerable			
Sawfish		Rhynchobatus luebberti	Lubbert's guitarfish	decreasing	Endangered			
Sawfish		Rhynchobatus sp. nov. A	Roughnose wedgefish	decreasing	Vulnerable			
Sawfish		Rhynchobatus springeri	Broadnose wedgefish	decreasing	Vulnerable			
Skate		Rioraja agassizii	Rio skate	unknown	Vulnerable			
Skate		Rostroraja alba	Bottlenose skate	decreasing	Endangered			
Skate		Spiniraja whitleyi	Melbourne skate	unknown	Vulnerable			
Skate		Sympterygia acuta	Bignose fanskate	decreasing	Vulnerable			
Stingray		Taeniura meyeni	Round ribbontail ray	unknown	Vulnerable			
Electric ray		Temera hardwickii	Finless sleeper ray	unknown	Vulnerable			
Stingray		Urogymnus asperrimus	Porcupine ray	unknown	Vulnerable			
Stingray		Urogymnus ukpam	Pincushion ray	unknown	Endangered			
Stingray		Urolophus bucculentus	Sandyback stingaree	decreasing	Vulnerable			
Stingray		Urolophus orarius	Coastal stingaree	unknown	Endangered			
Stingray		Urolophus sufflavus	Yellowback stingaree	decreasing	Vulnerable			
Stingray		Urolophus viridis	Greenback stingaree	decreasing	Vulnerable			
Stingray		Urotrygon reticulata	Reticulate round stingray	unknown	Vulnerable			
Stingray		Urotrygon simulatrix	Fake round ray	unknown	Vulnerable			
Sawfish		Zapteryx brevirostris	Shortnose guitarfish	decreasing	Vulnerable			
Skate		Zearaja chilensis	Yellownose skate	decreasing	Vulnerable			
Skate		Zearaja maugeana	Maugean skate	unknown	Endangered			

== See also ==
- List of threatened sharks
