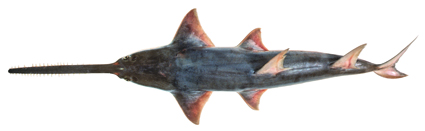

Conservation status
- Critically Endangered (IUCN 3.1)
- CITES Appendix I

Scientific classification
- Kingdom: Animalia
- Phylum: Chordata
- Class: Chondrichthyes
- Subclass: Elasmobranchii
- Order: Rhinopristiformes
- Family: Pristidae
- Genus: Anoxypristis; E. I. White and Moy-Thomas, 1941
- Species: A. cuspidata

Binomial name
- Anoxypristis cuspidata (Latham, 1794)

Synonyms
- Pristis cuspidata Latham, 1794; Anoxypristis cuspidate (Latham, 1794); Squalus semisagittatus Shaw, 1804

= Knifetooth sawfish =

Narrow sawfish Temporal range: 56–0 Ma Eocene to Present

Species of cartilaginous fish

The narrow sawfish (Anoxypristis cuspidata), also known as the pointed sawfish or knifetooth sawfish, is a species of sawfish in the family Pristidae, part of the Batoidea, a superorder of cartilaginous fish that include the rays and skates. Sawfish display a circumglobal distribution in warm marine and freshwater habitats. Their extant biodiversity is limited to five species belonging to two genera (Pristis and Anoxypristis). The sawfishes are characterised by the long, narrow, flattened rostrum or extension on their snout. This is lined with sharp transverse teeth, arranged in a way that resembles the teeth of a saw and are used for killing prey. It is found in the shallow coastal waters and estuaries of the Indo-West Pacific, ranging from the Persian Gulf to southern Japan, Papua New Guinea and northern Australia. It is the only living member of the genus Anoxypristis, but was previously included in the genus Pristis. Compared to Pristis, Anoxypristis has a narrower rostral saw with numerous teeth on the distal part and no teeth on the basal one-quarter (toothless section about one-sixth in juveniles). It reaches a length of up to 3.5 m (11 ft).

In addition to the living Anoxypristis cuspidata, this genus includes a few extinct species that are only known from fossil remains.

== Description ==
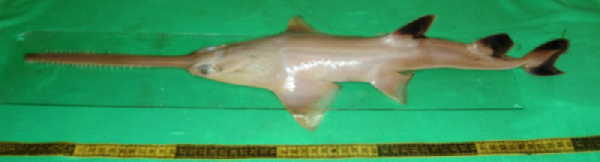
Knifetooth sawfish in 2014

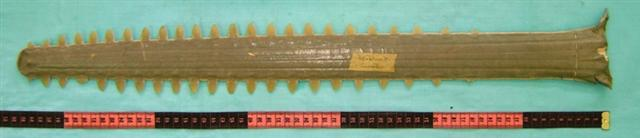
Rostrum

The narrow sawfish grows to a maximum length of about 3.5 m (11 ft), although there are highly questionable and unconfirmed claims of much larger individuals. Its body is generally shark-like, but its most obvious feature is the flattened head, which is extended forward in a blade-like bony snout with, in Australian waters, 18 to 22 pairs of sideways-facing teeth. However, elsewhere there may be as many as 25. These teeth are short, flat, and roughly triangular in shape. The blade does not taper towards its point and in adults, the basal one-quarter is devoid of teeth. In juveniles, about one-sixth of the base is toothless. The nostrils are narrow and partially concealed by nasal flaps. The skin of young sawfish is smooth, but on older individuals, it is sparsely covered in dermal denticles. The dorsal (upper) side of the fish is greyish and the ventral (lower) side and fins are a pale grey color. The rostrum is grey with white teeth and sometimes has a chocolate-brown base portion.

== Distribution and habitat ==
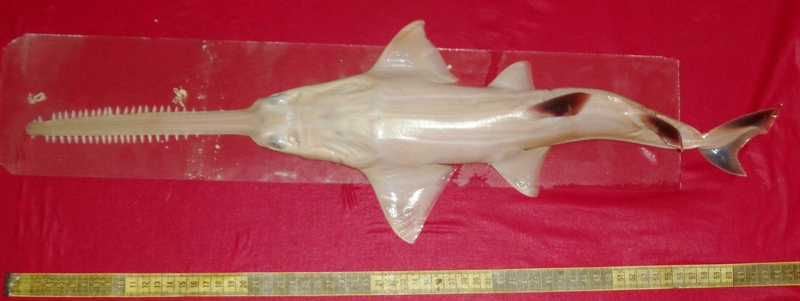
Topside

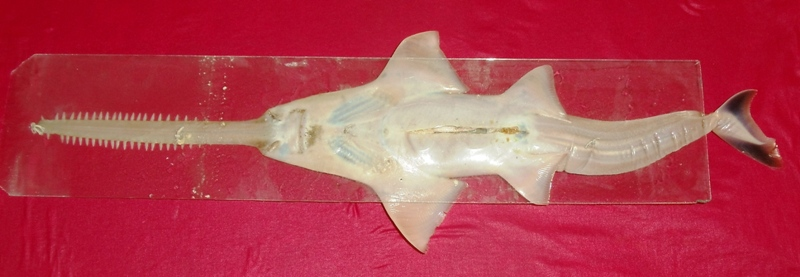
Underside

The narrow sawfish was historically distributed across a broad swathe of the Indo-Pacific Ocean. It is, or was, present in the waters off Iran, India, Sri Lanka, Bangladesh, Malaysia, Burma, Indonesia, and Papua New Guinea. At its western extreme, it is present in the Arabian Sea, extending as far south as Somalia. Its northern limit was the Bohai Sea, China, South Korea, and the most southerly parts of Japan, although its presence in the latter two countries may have been restricted to vagrants, and its southern limit is the northern Australian states of Western Australia, the Northern Territory, and Queensland. At present, it is known to exist only in the eastern Arabian Sea, parts of South Asia and Australia and Papua New Guinea.

The narrow sawfish is bentho-pelagic and is found at depths of about 100 meters (330 feet). The narrow sawfish prefers soft bottom-substrates, such as sand, mud, or seagrass, to rocky or coraline habitats. It can tolerate low salinity levels and is found in inshore waters, including bays and estuaries.

The narrow sawfish is euryhaline, meaning it can tolerate a wide range of salinity and move between

estuarine and marine environments. It undergoes an ontogenetic shift in habitat. Larger individuals are commonly found offshore, whereas smaller individuals are found inshore. Females are also more likely to be found offshore.

The narrow sawfish is suspected to be locally extinct in the coastal waters of Vietnam due to commercial fishing (especially trawling), coastal development, and subsequent habitat loss.

== Behavior ==
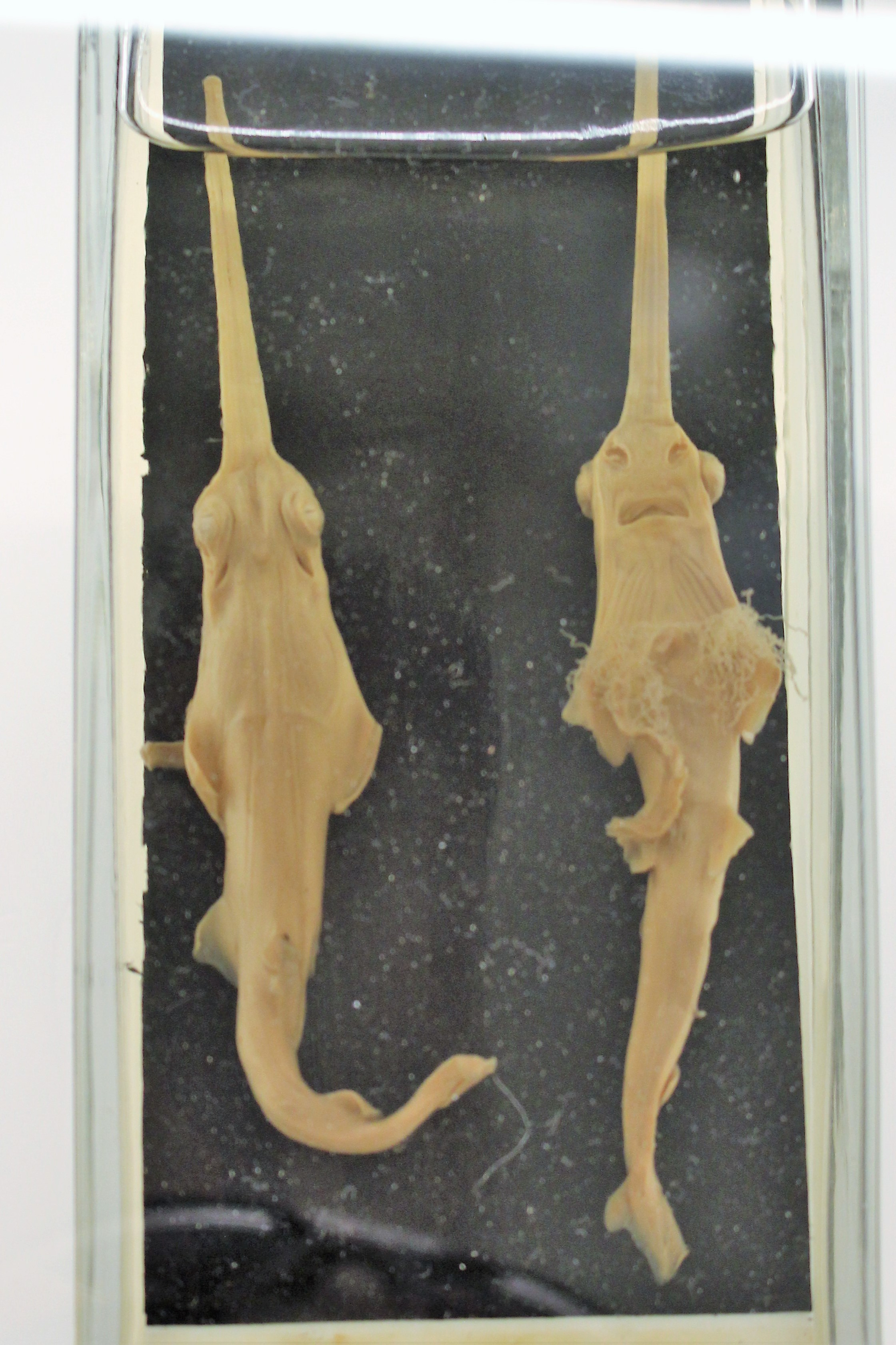
Babies

=== Reproduction and life history ===
The breeding behavior of the narrow sawfish has been little studied. Fertilization is internal, and a number of young develop at one time in the oviduct, each one being nourished from a yolk sac. Mating season varies by geographic region, and pups are born after a gestational period of about five months. Litter sizes range from 6 to 23 pups with an average of 12. The pups are usually 43–61 cm (17–24 in) long at birth, and their rostral teeth are not fully developed, being covered by a membrane, which prevents them from damaging the mother's tissues.

Only two studies have been conducted on the age and growth of the narrow sawfish. The longest-lived narrow sawfish found was nine years old. However, the theoretical longevity is calculated to be 27 years. Females begin to mature at 8 feet 1 inch (2.46 m) total length and are fully mature at 15 feet 5 inches (4.70 m). Males are fully mature at 8 feet (2.4 m) total length.

=== Temperament ===
The narrow sawfish is docile towards humans and not large enough to consider them as prey. If left undisturbed, it is harmless towards people. However, when highly stressed, such as when caught in a net, narrow sawfish will flail their heads from side to side to defend themselves. This can potentially inflict serious injury on unprotected persons who get too close.

=== Diet ===
The narrow sawfish feeds on small fish, squid, and invertebrates such as crabs and shrimp. It uses its rostrum in a side-to-side thrashing action to stir up the sediment and uncover concealed prey. It can also use its rostrum among schools of fish to incapacitate or stun individual fish. The head and rostrum of the sawfish contain thousands of electroreception organs called ampullae of lorenzini, which allow it to sense and locate the electric fields of its prey. The narrow sawfish is itself prey to various sharks such as the hammerhead shark (Sphyrna spp.), the bull shark (Carcharhinus leucas) and the copper shark (Carcharhinus brachyurus) and also the saltwater crocodile (Crocodylus porosus).

== Conservation status ==
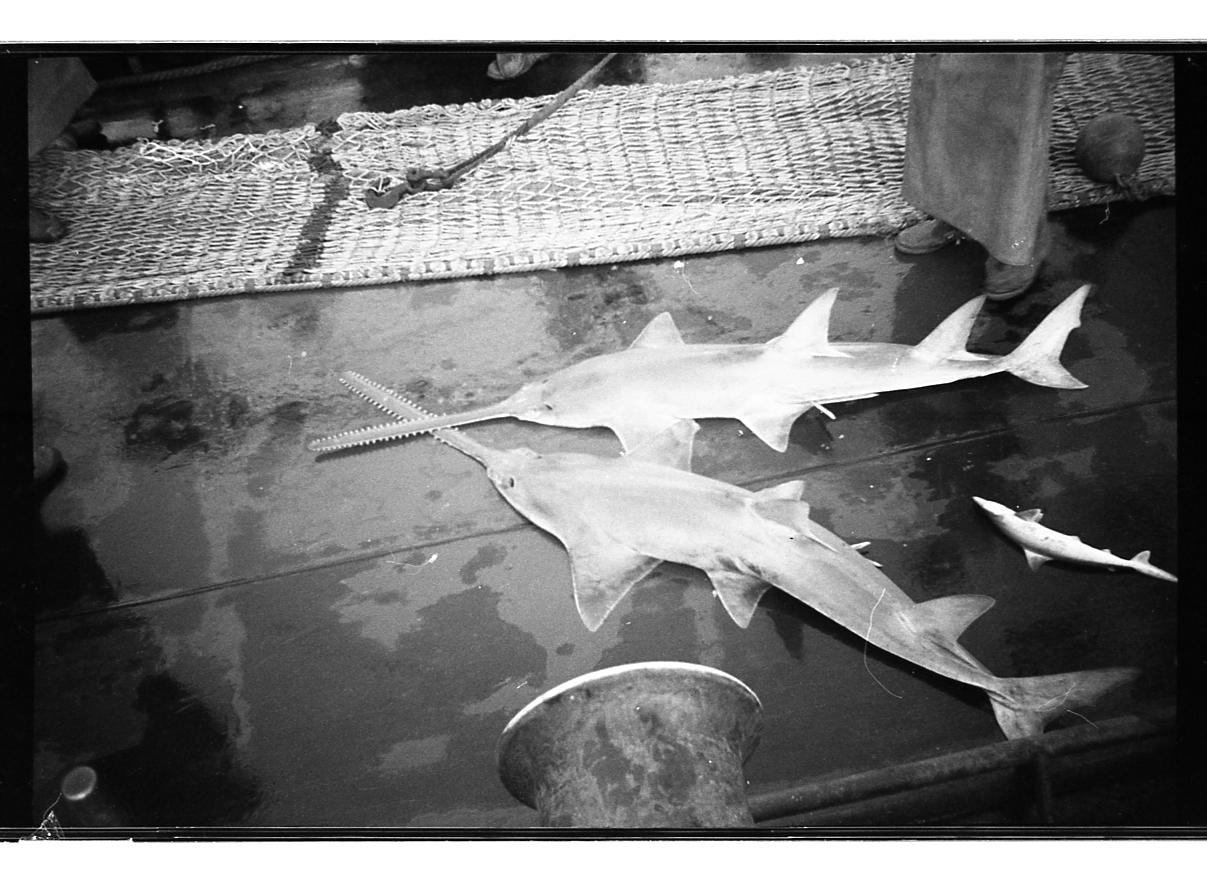
Anoxypristis cuspidata caught in 1977

=== Threats ===
Human actions are the main cause of the declining narrow sawfish populations and ranges. Overutilization, primarily from commercial fisheries, is its biggest threat. Narrow sawfish populations have likely decreased over 80% between 2004 and 2022. The narrow sawfish is a high-value target for fishermen. Sawfish are commonly hunted to make shark fin soup or for their rostrums to be displayed as trophies. Most countries have regulations against catching it; however, illegal, unreported, and unregulated fishing remains a threat. Furthermore, the narrow sawfish is or was a common bycatch for fisheries in its geographic range. The toothed rostrum makes it vulnerable to most types of fishing gear, particularly nets, with those made of nylon more difficult for sawfish to extricate themselves from. Damaged, neglected, or lost fishing gear (aka ghost nets) are also a considerable threat to narrow sawfish. Pregnant females and juveniles are at the highest risk for this threat. Additionally, the narrow sawfish has high post-release mortality, exacerbated by the difficulty of removing sawfish from fishing equipment.

Habitat loss and water pollution are also threats to the narrow sawfish. Coastal development, coastline urbanisation, and an expanding mining industry result in the modification and destruction of critical habitat. Furthermore, the pollution from these activities degrades the water quality. As of 2020, narrow sawfish may no longer be present in up to 61% of their historic range, according to the IUCN. These threats are expected to become more significant as the human population grows.

Natural threats, such as disease and predation, do not significantly harm the narrow sawfish population.

=== IUCN status ===
The IUCN listed the narrow sawfish as "Endangered" in its Red List of Threatened Species in the year 2000. This was due to the threats of overutilization, habitat loss, and a decreasing population. Its status was updated to "Critically Endangered" in 2006. In 2013, its status returned to "Endangered" due to the availability of new information. The 2023 assessment again categorized it as critically endangered, citing an estimated decrease in the global population by more than 80% in three sawfish generations or 18 years.

=== ESA listing ===
On September 10, 2010, WildEarth Guardians petitioned the US National Marine Fisheries Service (NMFS) to list six sawfish species – the narrow sawfish; the dwarf sawfish, the freshwater sawfish, the common sawfish, the narrowsnout sawfish, and the smalltooth sawfish – as endangered or threatened under the Endangered Species Act of 1973. The NMFS published a 90-day review on March 7, 2011, stating that action may be warranted for five of the six species. Information available at the time indicated that the common sawfish was not a valid species. On June 4, 2013, the NMFS published a proposal that concluded all five sawfish species were at high risk for extinction. The proposal listed habitat loss, water quality, and overutilization as the biggest threats to the narrow sawfish. The NMFS published its final ruling on December 12, 2014, which listed all five sawfish species as endangered. Scientific data showed that geographical areas occupied by the narrow sawfish were entirely outside U.S. jurisdiction. Therefore, the NMFS was not able to designate any critical habitat. Furthermore, the NMFS did not develop a recovery plan because they would not be able to enforce it.

=== Conservation efforts ===
Western Australia and Queensland have listed protections for the Narrow Sawfish as a "no-take" species. Sawfish also are considered "no-take" species in India, but the legislation is frequently ignored and rarely enforced. International trade of the narrow sawfish has been banned by its inclusion in the Convention on International Trade in Endangered Species of Wild Fauna and Flora (CITES) Appendix 1.

The current population of the narrow sawfish is unknown.

== See also ==
- Threatened rays

Collareta, Alberto; Casati, Simone; Catanzariti, Rita; Di Cencio, Andrea (2017). "First record of the knifetooth sawfish Anoxypristis (Elasmobranchii: Rhinopristiformes) from the Pliocene of Tuscany (central Italy)". Neues Jahrbuch für Geologie und Paläontologie - Abhandlungen. 284 (3): 289–297. Bibcode:2017NJGPA.284..289C. doi:10.1127/njgpa/2017/0663.
