= Pristis amblodon =

Pristis amblodon Temporal range: 40.4–15.97 Ma

Scientific classification
- Domain: Eukaryota
- Kingdom: Animalia
- Phylum: Chordata
- Class: Chondrichthyes
- Subclass: Elasmobranchii
- Order: Rhinopristiformes
- Family: Pristidae
- Genus: Pristis
- Species: †P. amblodon

Binomial name
- †Pristis amblodon Cope, 1869

Extinct species of fish

Pristis amblodon is an extinct species of sawfish within the family Pristidae. It currently has two occurrences originating from New Jersey in both the Eocene and Miocene epoch. It was a nektobenthic species that lived in marine waters.
