= Pristis aquitanicus =

Pristis aquitanicus Temporal range: Miocene, 15.97–11.608 Ma

Scientific classification
- Kingdom: Animalia
- Phylum: Chordata
- Class: Chondrichthyes
- Subclass: Elasmobranchii
- Order: Rhinopristiformes
- Family: Pristidae
- Genus: Pristis
- Species: †P. aquitanicus

Binomial name
- †Pristis aquitanicus Delfortrie, 1871

Extinct species of sawfish

Pristis aquitanicus is an extinct species of sawfish in the family Pristidae. It lived in the Neogene period in France, Portugal, Florida, and India. It lived in marine, bays, and estuaries. It was a nektobenthic carnivore.

Its origin traces back to Savigné.
