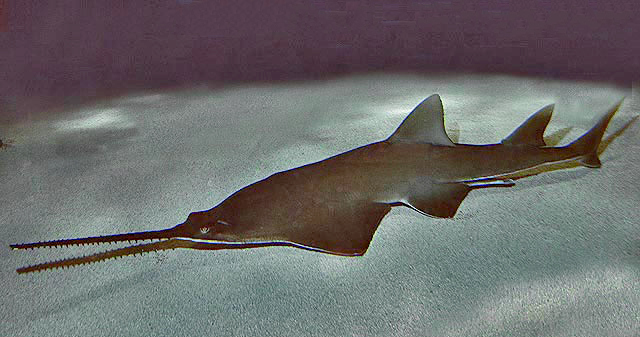
- Pristis pectinata in Aquarium of the Americas

Conservation status
- Critically Endangered (IUCN 3.1)
- CITES Appendix I

Scientific classification
- Kingdom: Animalia
- Phylum: Chordata
- Class: Chondrichthyes
- Subclass: Elasmobranchii
- Order: Rhinopristiformes
- Family: Pristidae
- Genus: Pristis
- Species: P. pectinata

Binomial name
- Pristis pectinata Latham, 1794
- IUCN range Extant (resident) Possibly extinct Presence uncertain

= Smalltooth sawfish =

Species of cartilaginous fish

The smalltooth sawfish (Pristis pectinata) is a species of sawfish in the family Pristidae. It is found in shallow tropical and subtropical waters in coastal and estuarine parts of the Atlantic. Reports from elsewhere are now believed to be misidentifications of other species of sawfish. It is a critically endangered species that has disappeared from much of its historical range.

== Distribution and habitat ==
The smalltooth sawfish is found in tropical and subtropical parts of the Atlantic, including the Caribbean and Gulf of Mexico. Its original range was the smallest of the sawfish species, covering about 2,100,000 km^{2} (810,000 mi^{2}). In the west it once ranged from the United States to Uruguay and in the east from Senegal to Angola. Today it has disappeared from much of its historical range. There are old reports from the Mediterranean Sea, but this likely involved vagrants and according to the FAO the species can be considered locally extinct in the Mediterranean Sea.

Smalltooth sawfish are mostly found in coastal marine and estuarine brackish waters. It prefers water less than 8 m (26 ft) deep, but adults are occasionally seen offshore at depths of up to 122 m (400 ft). During periods with increased salinity, juveniles have been seen far up rivers. This species is mostly found in places with soft bottoms such as mud or sand, but may also occur over hard rocky bottoms or at coral reefs. They are often found in areas with mangrove or seagrass. The lower water temperature limit is 16–18 °C (61–64 °F).

== Appearance ==
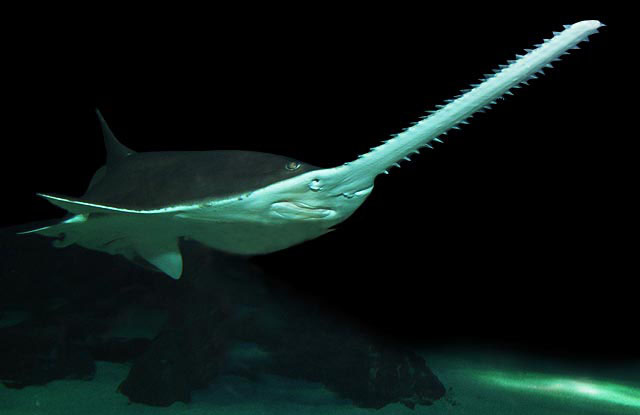
Smalltooth sawfish at the Aquarium of the Americas

The smalltooth sawfish reputedly reaches a total length of up to 7.6 m (25 ft), but this is likely an exaggeration and the largest confirmed size is 5.54 m (18.2 ft). It weighs up to 350 kg (770 lb).

Its upperparts are brownish-gray, gray, bluish-gray or blackish, and the underparts are whitish.

Unlike the largetooth sawfish (P. pristis), the only other sawfish in the Atlantic, the smalltooth sawfish has a leading edge of the dorsal fin that is placed roughly above the leading edge of the pelvic fins (when the sawfish is seen from above or the side), relatively short pectoral fins and lack of a distinct lower lobe to the tail (lower lobe very small or absent). It can be separated from the more similar dwarf sawfish (P. clavata) and green sawfish (P. zijsron) by the distribution (both are only found in the Indo-Pacific) and the dorsal fin (its leading edge is placed slightly or clearly behind the leading edge of the pelvic fins in the dwarf and green sawfish). The smalltooth sawfish has a relatively narrow rostrum ("saw") with 20–32 teeth on each side. (Note: Sawfish occasionally lose teeth during their life and these are not replaced. Correct tooth count refers to actual teeth and alveoli ("tooth sockets") from lost teeth.)

== Function of the saw ==
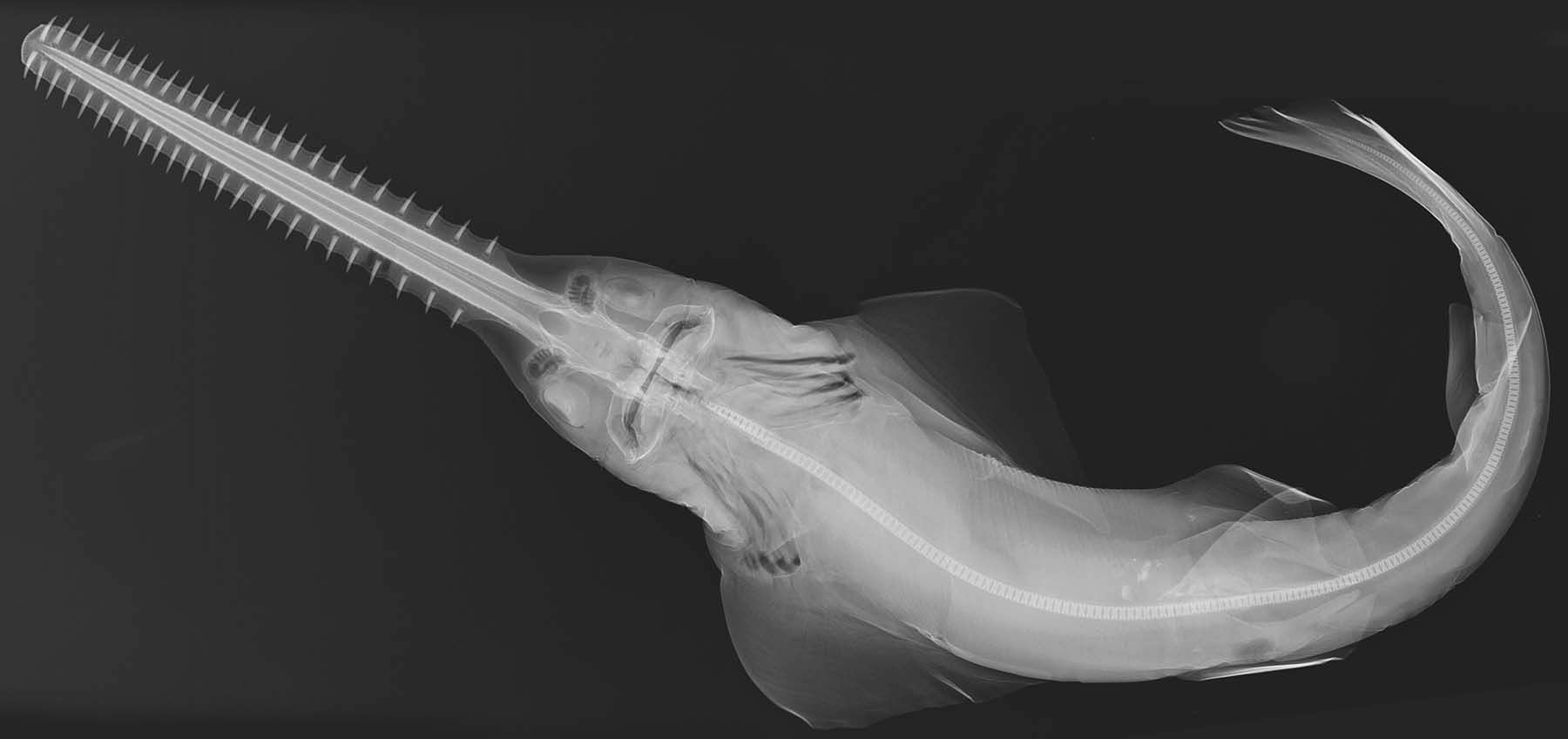
Pristis pectinata, X-ray image

=== For feeding ===
For many years, rarity of seeing a sawfish in the wild prevented scientists from collecting conclusive evidence about the use of their distinctive rostrum. This led them to falsely assume that the sawfish, like many other marine vertebrates with a "beak," or an elongated rostrum, follow the rule that the appendage is used to either sense prey or capture prey, but never both. There are no other highly studied marine animals with similar rostral characteristics that have shown that the rostrum is used for both of these feeding techniques. Recent studies have demonstrated, however, that the sawfish utilize their rostrum to both sense and manipulate prey.

A sawfish's saw is made up of thousands of sensory organs that allow them to detect and monitor the movements of other organisms by measuring the electric fields they emit. The sensory organs, also called ampullary pores, are packed most densely on the dorsal side of its beak. This allows the fish to create an image of the three-dimensional area above it, even in waters of low-visibility. This provides support for the bottom-dwelling behavior of sawfish. Utilizing their saw as an extended sensing device, sawfish are able to "view" their entire surroundings by maintaining a position low to the sea floor.

Sawfish were thought to primarily prey upon sand dwelling crustaceans and mollusks, similar to other ray species or the closely related group of guitarfishes, by using their unique anatomical structure as a tool for digging and grubbing about in sand or mud, However, molecular evidence from prey item identification of DNA in the feces of southwest Florida smalltooth sawfish using a broad 18S rRNA molecular marker indicated the majority of their diet (71% of animal DNA sequences) consists of fish. The same study found mollusks and crustaceans were a minority (14% of animal DNA sequences) and nearly all were identified as Harpacticoida copepods, making it an unlikely prey item due to its small size and may represent 'secondary predation', a phenomenon where the DNA of an organism consumed by a prey item is detected in molecular gut or fecal analyses of a predator. A follow-up study using higher resolution mitochondrial 12S and 16S rRNA markers targeting fishes determined smalltooth sawfish to be a generalist piscivore, identifying the DNA of 24 fish species from 7 orders and 11 families across 15 fecal samples analyzed.

It is believed that the elongated rostrum first evolved for its use in prey immobilization. Smalltooth sawfish have been observed to approach large shoals of fish while striking their saw rapidly from side to side. Due to the high density of small fish in a shoal, there is a high probability that the sawfish will hit, stab, stun, or kill several prey during one shoal attack.

Vertebrate biologist Barbara Wueringer, of the University of Queensland, demonstrated that sawfish use their extended rostrum to detect and manipulate prey. She observed the animals' reaction to food already at the bottom of the tank, food falling from the water's surface, and introduced electric dipoles. When the sawfish came across scraps of fish resting on the bottom of the tank, it used its rostrum to pin the "prey" down as it swam over and engulfed it. When food was identified as it fell through the water, the sawfish would approach its "prey" from the side and swiftly strike to impale the victim with the teeth of its saw. Both of these cases support the respective digging and attacking behaviors expected from feeding sawfish in the wild. In order to show that sawfish use their beak to sense their surroundings, Wueringer placed electric dipoles throughout the tank to simulate the electrical signals that surround moving prey. Just as the sawfish displayed different aggressive behaviors towards the "prey," they also responded differently based on the electrical signals they received by either avoiding or approaching the signal source. With this evidence, the sawfish is now regarded as the only jawed fish to use its rostrum for both prey detection and manipulation.

=== For defense ===
The many teeth of a sawfish's saw are not actually teeth at all, but rather special types of scales known as dermal denticles. These protruding weapons, combined with the animal's ability to strike from side to side with great force, provide it with a powerful and efficient defense mechanism. Although the saw is mainly used for feeding purposes, observations of sawfish in captivity show that they may also be used for self-defense. When sharks or other marine creatures threaten them, they retaliate with three swift blows to the instigator's dorsum. Sawfish are not considered harmful to humans unless they are threatened.

== Reproductive behavior ==
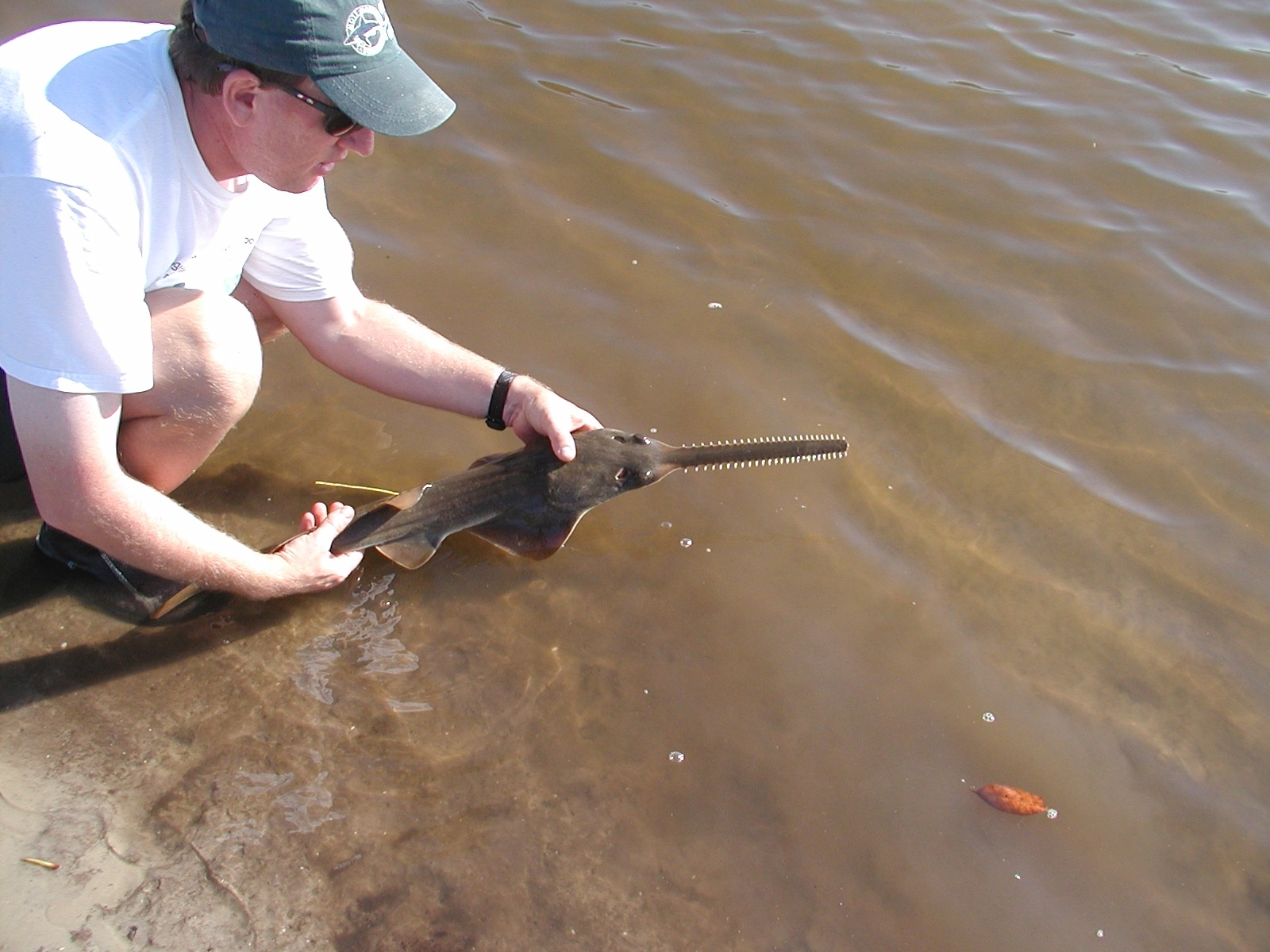
A juvenile smalltooth sawfish being released

The reproductive behavior of smalltooth sawfish has not been well studied, despite their classification as a critically endangered species. Nevertheless, much can be inferred based on information known about the reproductive behavior of other elasmobranchs. Observations show that smalltooth sawfish may participate in precopulatory behavior in captivity. Much of this activity involves the biting of pectoral fins known as "courtship biting." There is sexual dimorphism in the teeth of smalltooth sawfish, with males presenting a higher mean value for both left and right rostral tooth counts. The electrosensory system is believed to be used in the courtship behavior of sawfish and other elasmobranchs. Reproductively active males use the sensory organs in their saw to locate females and vice versa. Once a mate has been selected, several copulations occur during which the male inserts his claspers, which are paired intromittent organs, into the female's vagina. The claspers contain subdermal siphon sacs that provide the propulsive power for sperm transfer. It is also possible that the siphon sacs assist with sawfish sperm competition by washing away rival sperm from the female's vagina before copulations.

Smalltooth sawfish have recently been observed, for the first time, to reproduce parthenogenetically in the wild. About 3 percent of the sawfish living in a Florida estuary are the result of parthenogenesis. The research team speculates that since smalltooth sawfish are so rare, females might sometimes fail to find a male during the mating season, inducing the parthenogenetic process.

Elasmobranchs are ovoviviparous, have relatively long gestation periods, and internal fertilization. The sawfish eggs hatch in the uterus and the young continue to grow without a placental connection to the mother. The fetal sawfish receives nourishment from a yolk sac and absorbs all the nutrients it can from the yolk before it is born. Litters have been reported of up to 20 pups and the reproductive cycle is believed to be every two years. After sex, mating pairs separate without forming a pair bond and each continues polygamous matings.

== Conservation status ==
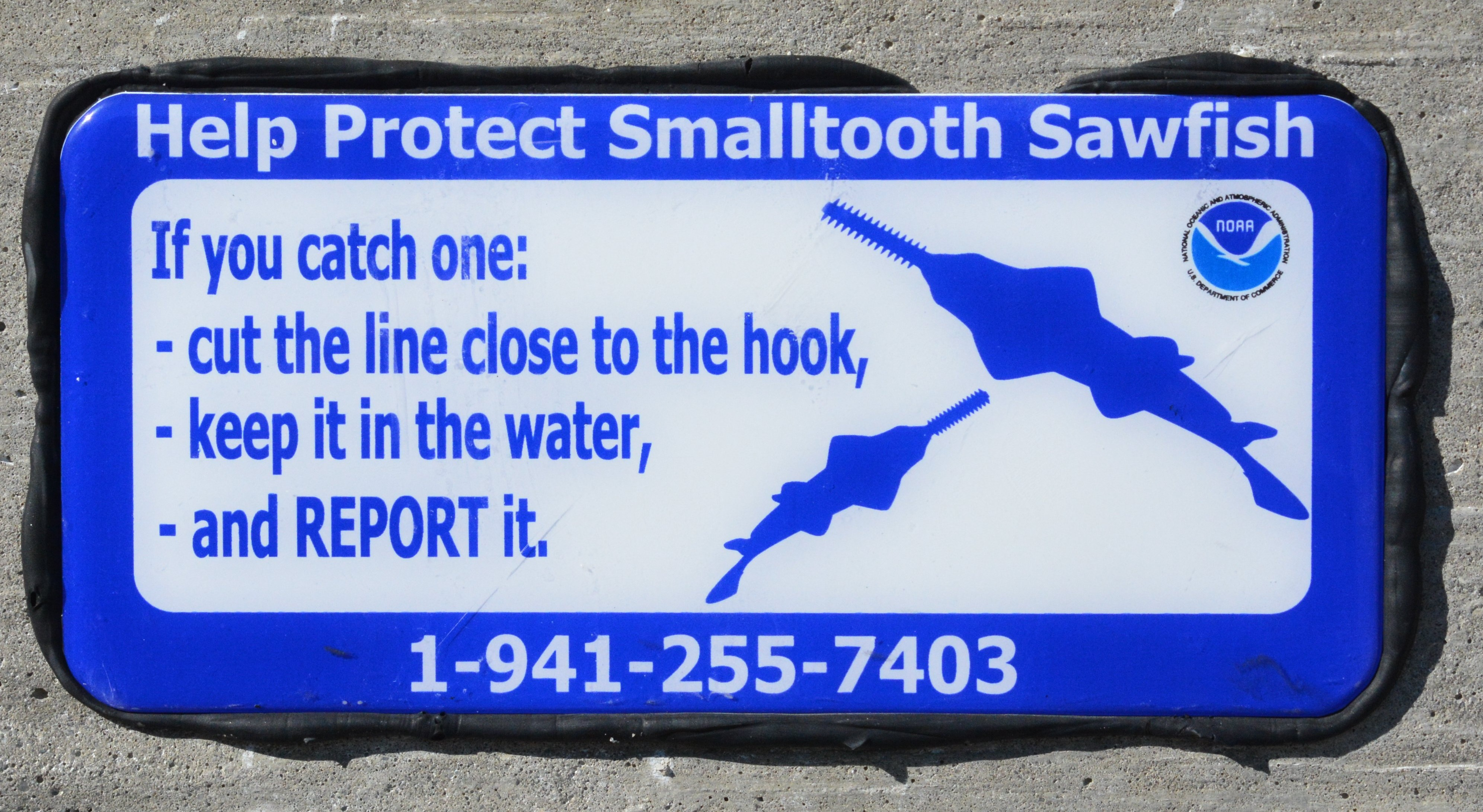
Sign for the protection of smalltooth sawfish in Florida, USA

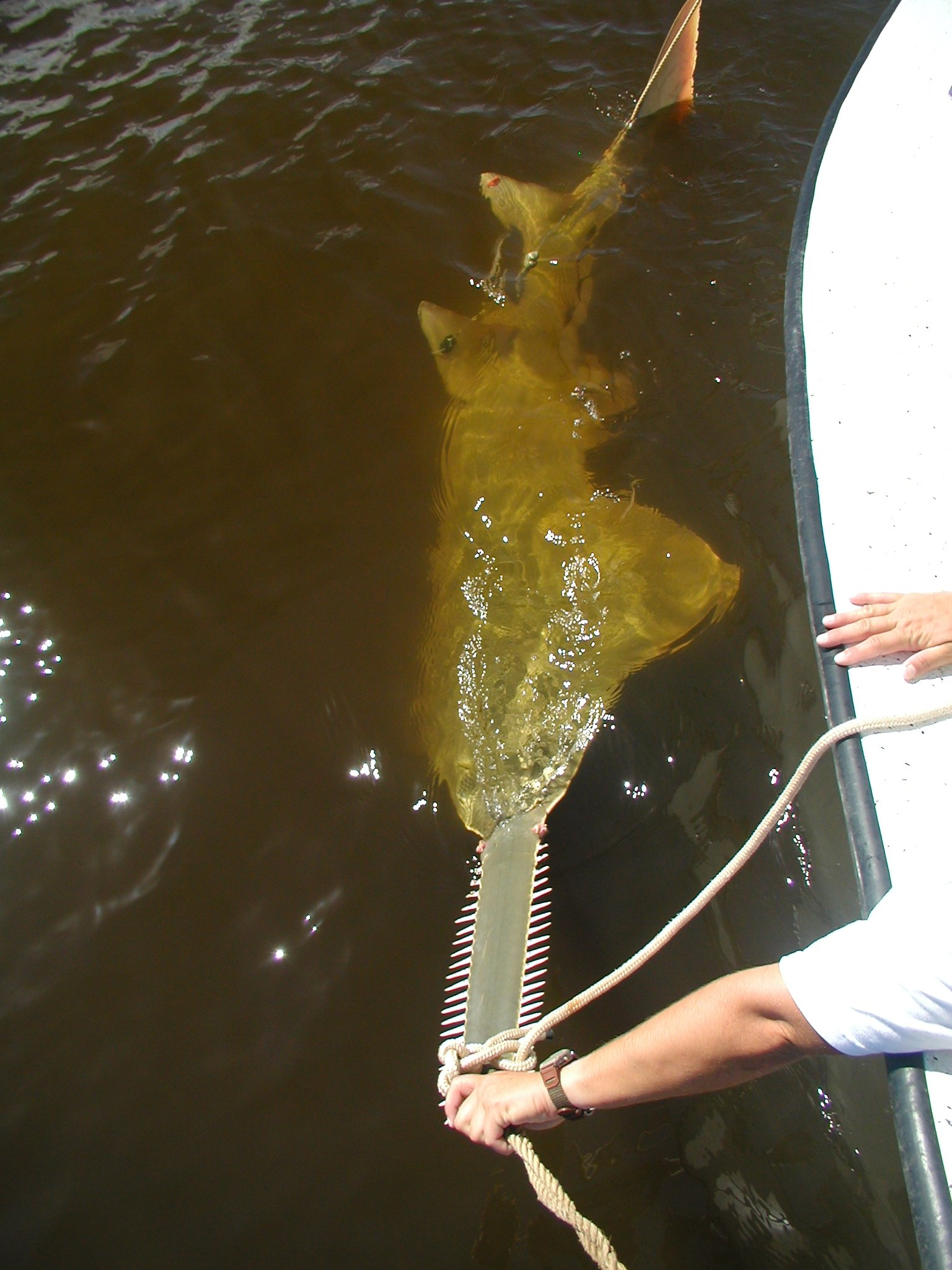
A smalltooth sawfish briefly captured for tagging as part of a conservation project

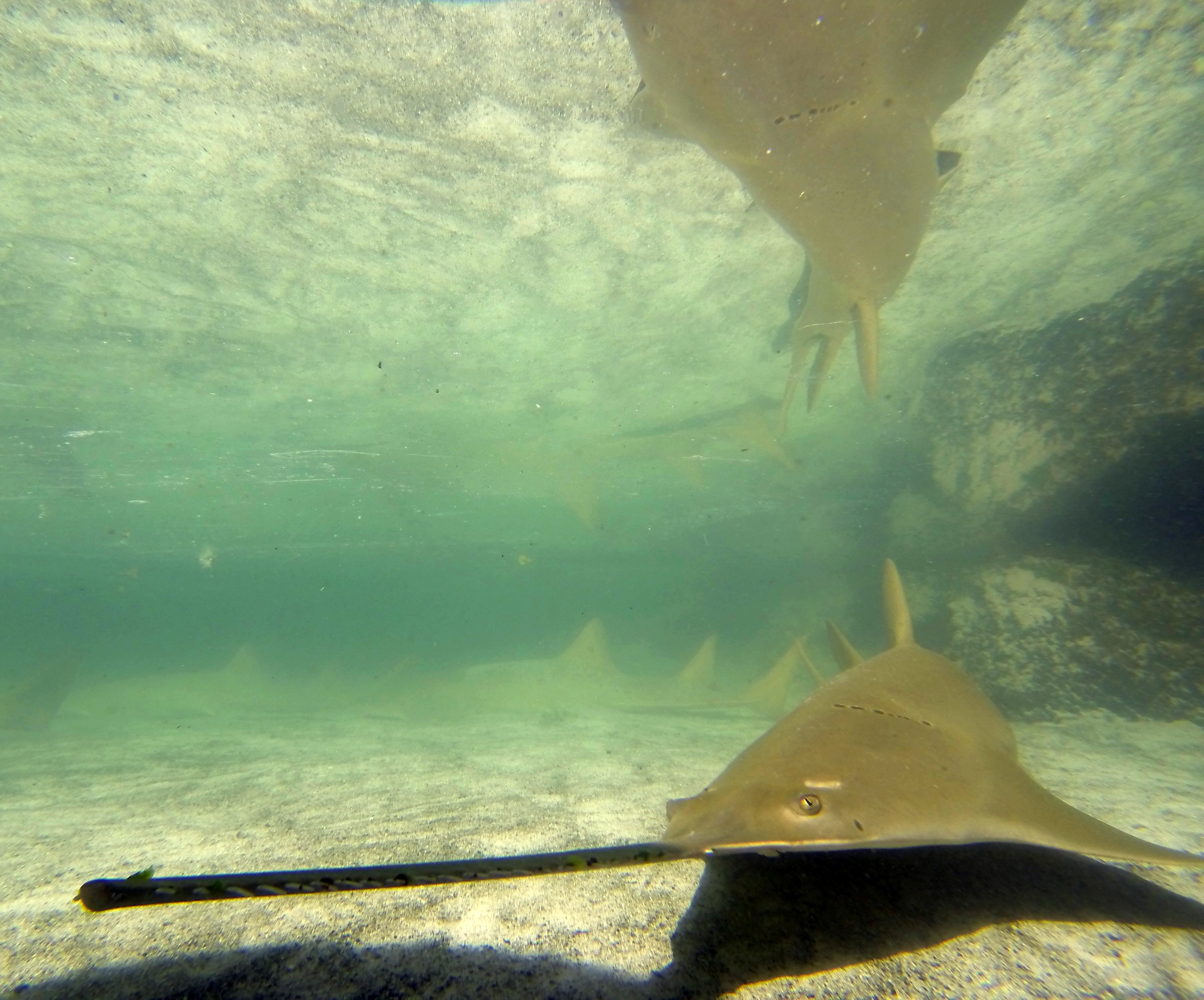
Atlantis Paradise Island became the world's first aquarium to breed sawfish when four pups were born there in 2012.

Smalltooth sawfish are extremely vulnerable to overexploitation because of their propensity for entanglement in nets, their restricted habitat, and low rate of population growth. The species is listed as critically endangered by the IUCN Red List. The Pristis pectinata species is critically endangered mainly because of the fishing pressure business which feeds into the shark-fin industry. Historically it was found in 47 countries, but it has been possibly extirpated from 26 countries and its presence is uncertain in a further 16 countries, leaving only five countries where it certainly still survives, although the IUCN lists it as surviving in nine countries. In terms of area, the authors of the former estimate, Dulvy et al., believe it certainly survives in only 19% of its historical range. It is the only sawfish that certainly still survives in the United States (the largetooth sawfish, P. pristis, has likely been extirpated from this country), and it has been listed by the National Marine Fisheries Service as endangered under the Endangered Species Act since 2003. It is estimated that the smalltooth sawfish population in the United States now is less than 5% of historical levels. In the United States it once occurred from Texas to New York (northern range as summer visitors), but today it is essentially limited to Florida. In the Everglades region of Florida the population is now stable and possibly slowly rising. Other countries where it certainly survives are the Bahamas, Cuba, Belize, Honduras and Sierra Leone, but whether it survives in the western Gulf of Mexico or off the Atlantic coast of South America is unclear. The species is listed on Appendix I of the Convention on International Trade in Endangered Species.

Small numbers are maintained in public aquariums in North America with studbooks listing 12 individuals (5 males, 7 females) in 2014. The only kept elsewhere are at a public aquarium in Colombia. It is the only species of sawfish that has been bred in captivity.

In early 2024, state and federal wildlife agencies in Florida, USA, became aware of an "unusual mortality event" from an unknown cause. Affected fish exhibited spinning or whirling behavior. An effort was being made to rescue and rehabilitate affected fish.

== See also ==
- Threatened rays
