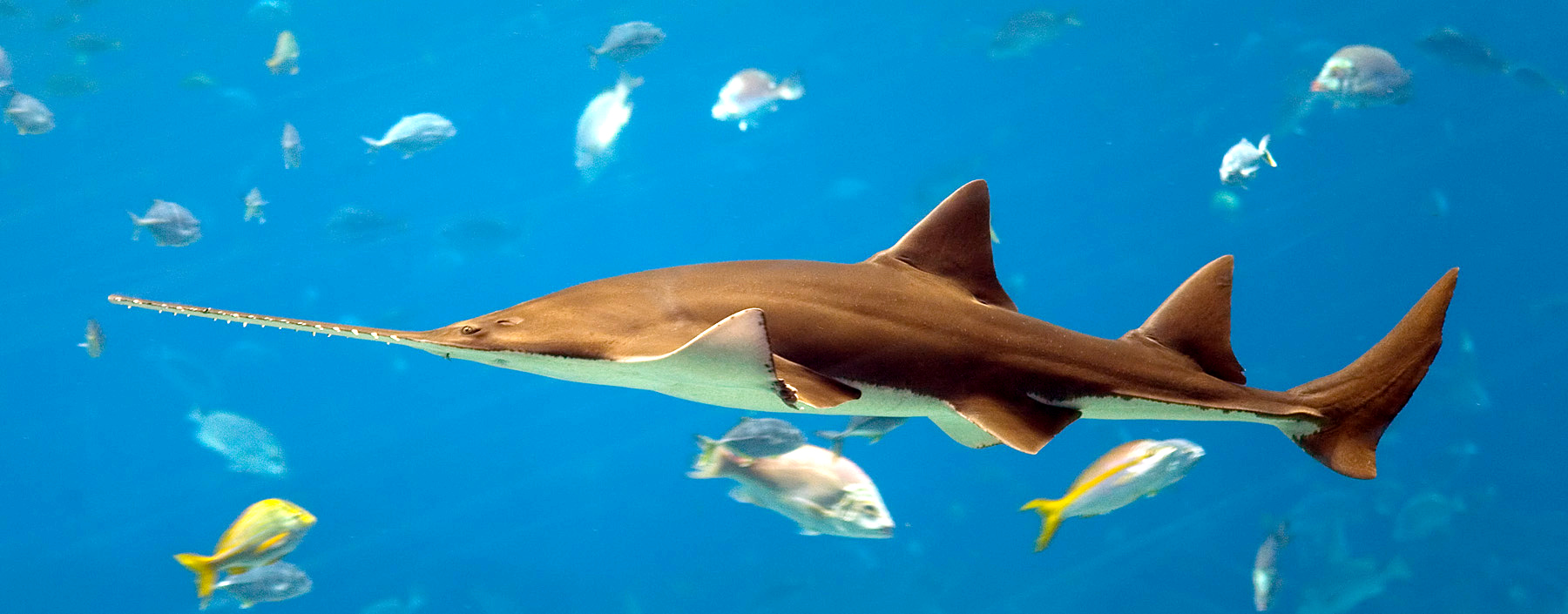
- Pristis pristis
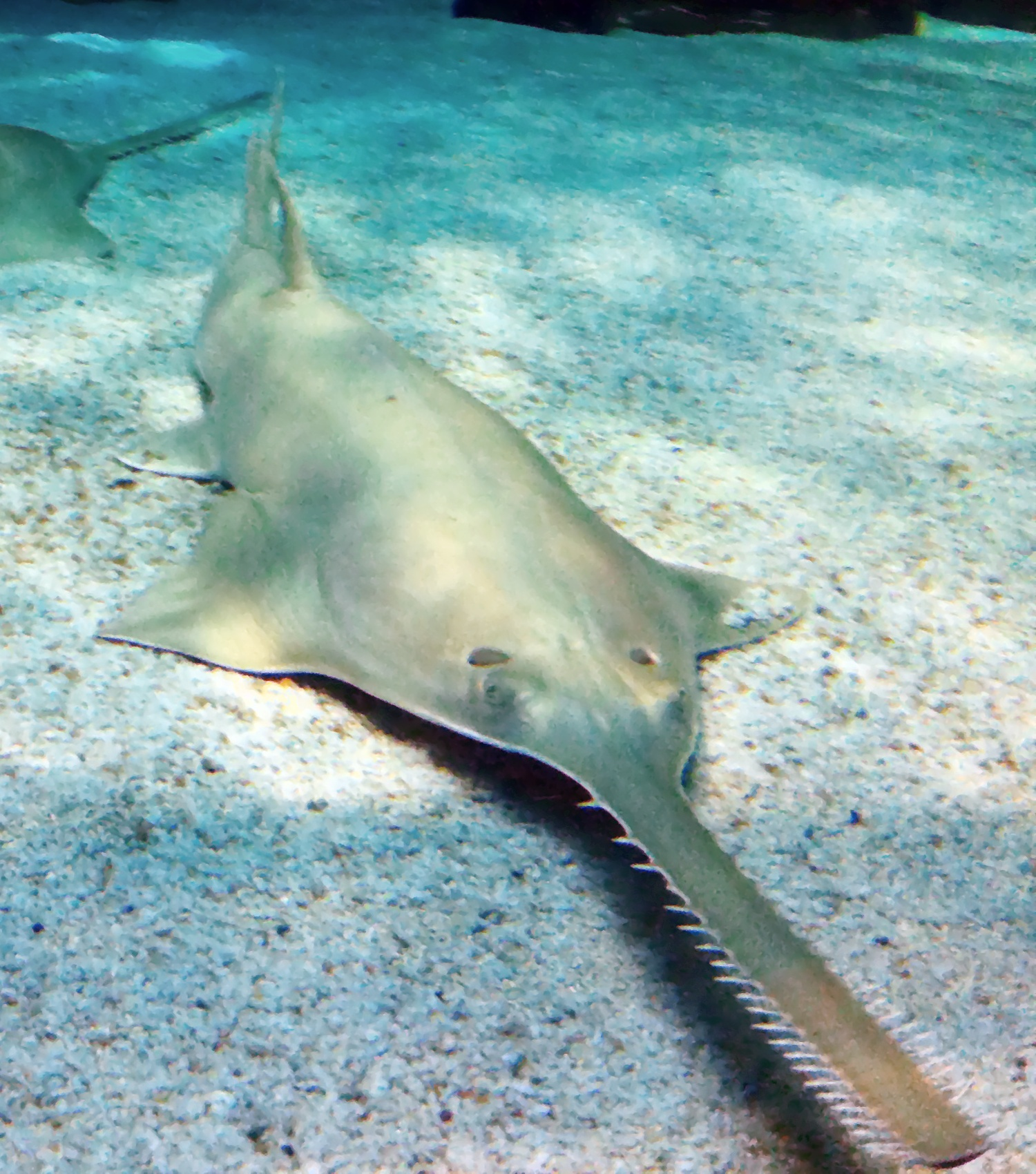
- Pristis zijsron

Scientific classification
- Kingdom: Animalia
- Phylum: Chordata
- Class: Chondrichthyes
- Subclass: Elasmobranchii
- Order: Rhinopristiformes
- Family: Pristidae
- Genus: Pristis; Linck, 1790

= Pristis =

Pristis Temporal range: Late Paleocene - Recent

Genus of cartilaginous fishes

Pristis is a genus of sawfish of the family Pristidae. These large fish are found worldwide in tropical and subtropical regions in coastal marine waters, estuaries, and freshwater lakes and rivers. Sawfish have declined drastically and all species are considered critically endangered today.

== Taxonomy ==
The scientific genus name Pristis is derived from the Greek word for saw.

=== Living species ===
Recent authorities recognize four species:

- Pristis clavata Garman, 1906 — dwarf sawfish, Queensland sawfish
- Pristis pectinata Latham, 1794 — smalltooth sawfish
- Pristis pristis (Linnaeus, 1758) — largetooth sawfish, common sawfish, freshwater sawfish, Leichhardt's sawfish
- Pristis zijsron Bleeker, 1851 — longcomb sawfish, green sawfish

These are divided into two species groups. Most are considered a part of the smalltooth group, except P. pristis which is the sole member of the largetooth group. Two additional species, P. microdon and P. perotteti, have historically been recognized, but in 2013 it was shown that they are conspecific with P. pristis as morphological and genetic differences are lacking, leading recent authorities to treat them as synonyms. Anoxypristis cuspidata was formerly included in Pristis, but it has a number of distinctive features (for example, no teeth on the basal quarter of the saw) and recent authorities place it in its own genus.

=== Extinct species ===
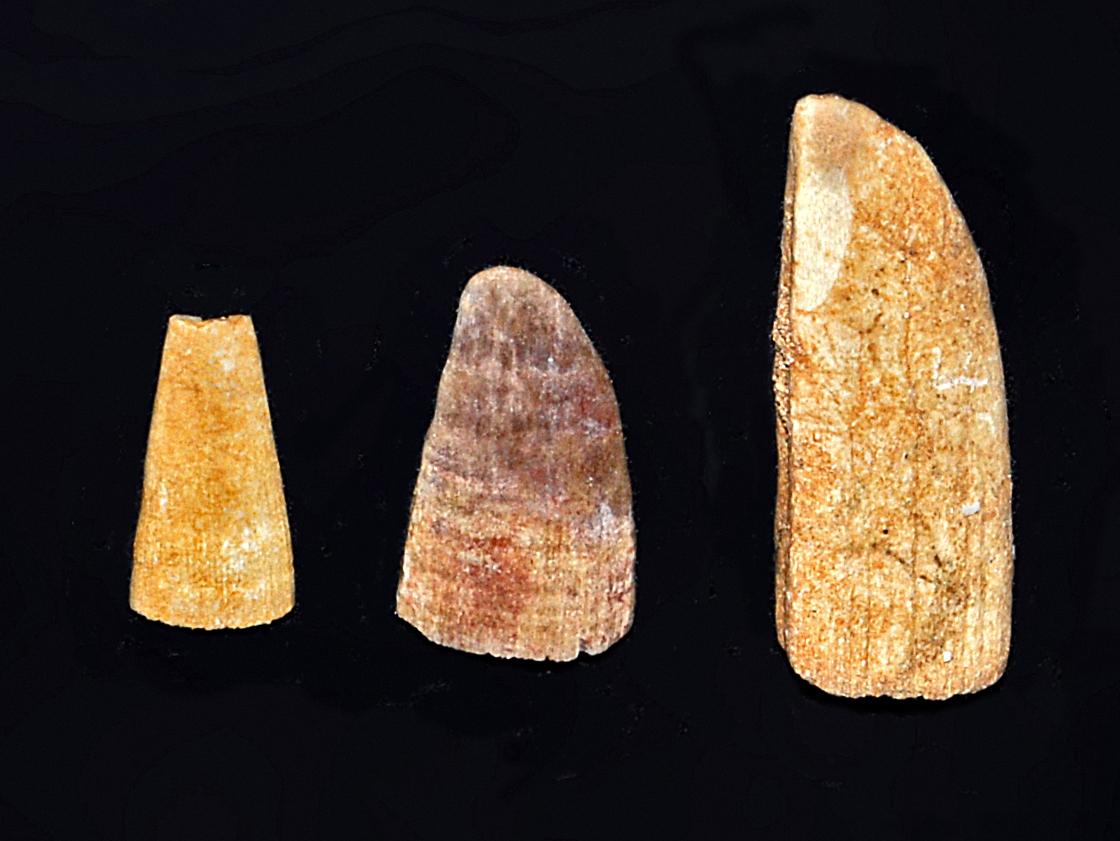
Fossil rostal teeth of Pristis lathami from Khouribga (Morocco.)

According to Fossilworks, extinct Pristis species only known from fossil remains include:

- Pristis acutidens Agassiz 1843
- Pristis amblodon Cope 1869
- Pristis aquitanicus Delfortrie 1871
- Pristis atlanticus Zbyszewski 1947
- Pristis bisulcatus Agassiz 1843
- Pristis brachyodon Cope 1869
- Pristis brayi Casier 1949
- Pristis caheni Dartevelle and Casier 1959
- Pristis contortus Dixon 1850
- Pristis curvidens Leidy 1855
- Pristis dubius Münster 1846
- Pristis ensidens Leidy 1855
- Pristis fajumensis Stromer 1905
- Pristis hastingsiae Agassiz 1843
- Pristis lanceolatus Jonet 1968
- Pristis lathami Galeotti 1837
- Pristis olbrechtsi Dartevelle and Casier 1959
- Pristis pectinatus Latham 1794
- Pristis pickeringi Case 1981
- Pristis prosulcatus Stromer 1905

However, among this list are some species considered invalid by recent authorities and others now generally recognized as belonging in Anoxypristis. Fossil Pristis range from the Late Paleocene to the Quaternary period. Fossils have been found all over the world.
