= White-spotted guitarfish =

Conservation status
- Critically Endangered (IUCN 3.1)

Scientific classification
- Kingdom: Animalia
- Phylum: Chordata
- Class: Chondrichthyes
- Subclass: Elasmobranchii
- Order: Rhinopristiformes
- Family: Rhinobatidae
- Genus: Rhinobatos
- Species: R. albomaculatus

Binomial name
- Rhinobatos albomaculatus Norman, 1930

Species of cartilaginous fish

The white-spotted guitarfish (Rhinobatos albomaculatus) is a type of ray. It is found in the eastern Atlantic from the Gulf of Guinea to Angola. It reaches a length of approximately 75 cm.
