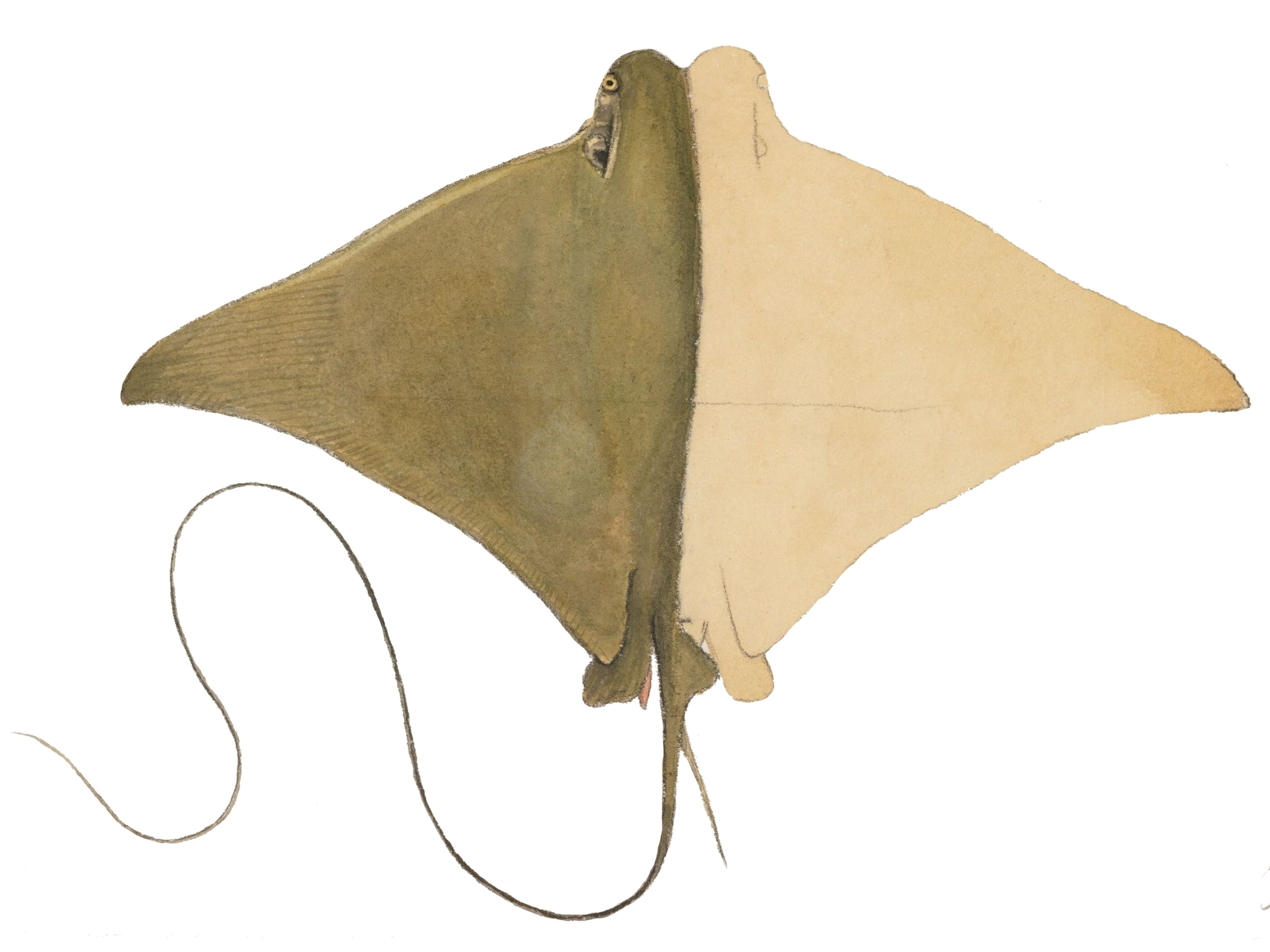

Conservation status
- Vulnerable (IUCN 3.1)

Scientific classification
- Kingdom: Animalia
- Phylum: Chordata
- Class: Chondrichthyes
- Subclass: Elasmobranchii
- Order: Myliobatiformes
- Family: Rhinopteridae
- Genus: Rhinoptera
- Species: R. brasiliensis

Binomial name
- Rhinoptera brasiliensis J. P. Müller, 1836

= Brazilian cownose ray =

Species of fish

The Brazilian cownose ray (Rhinoptera brasiliensis), also commonly called the Ticon cownose ray, is a species of fish in the family Rhinopteridae. Its range extends along the coast from the southern tip of Brazil to western Florida. Its natural habitats are shallow seas, estuarine waters, and intertidal flats.

== Morphology ==
Males tend to range in size from 78 to 91 cm disc width (DW) with a brown back and white or light yellow belly. Females are larger, ranging from 77 to 102 cm DW with similar coloring. The Ticon cownose ray very closely resembles its cousin the cownose ray (Rhinoptera bonasus) in both size and coloring. So close is the similarity that the only way to differentiate the two is by the number of teeth. R. brasiliensis have a broader mouth allowing for three central rows of broad teeth as opposed to R. bonasus one central row.

== Reproduction ==
The Brazilian cownose ray is ovoviviparous with the embryo developing in an egg kept within the female. The female only carries one embryo at a time. This low fecundity leads to a low species resiliency with a minimum population doubling time of 4.5 to 14 years.
