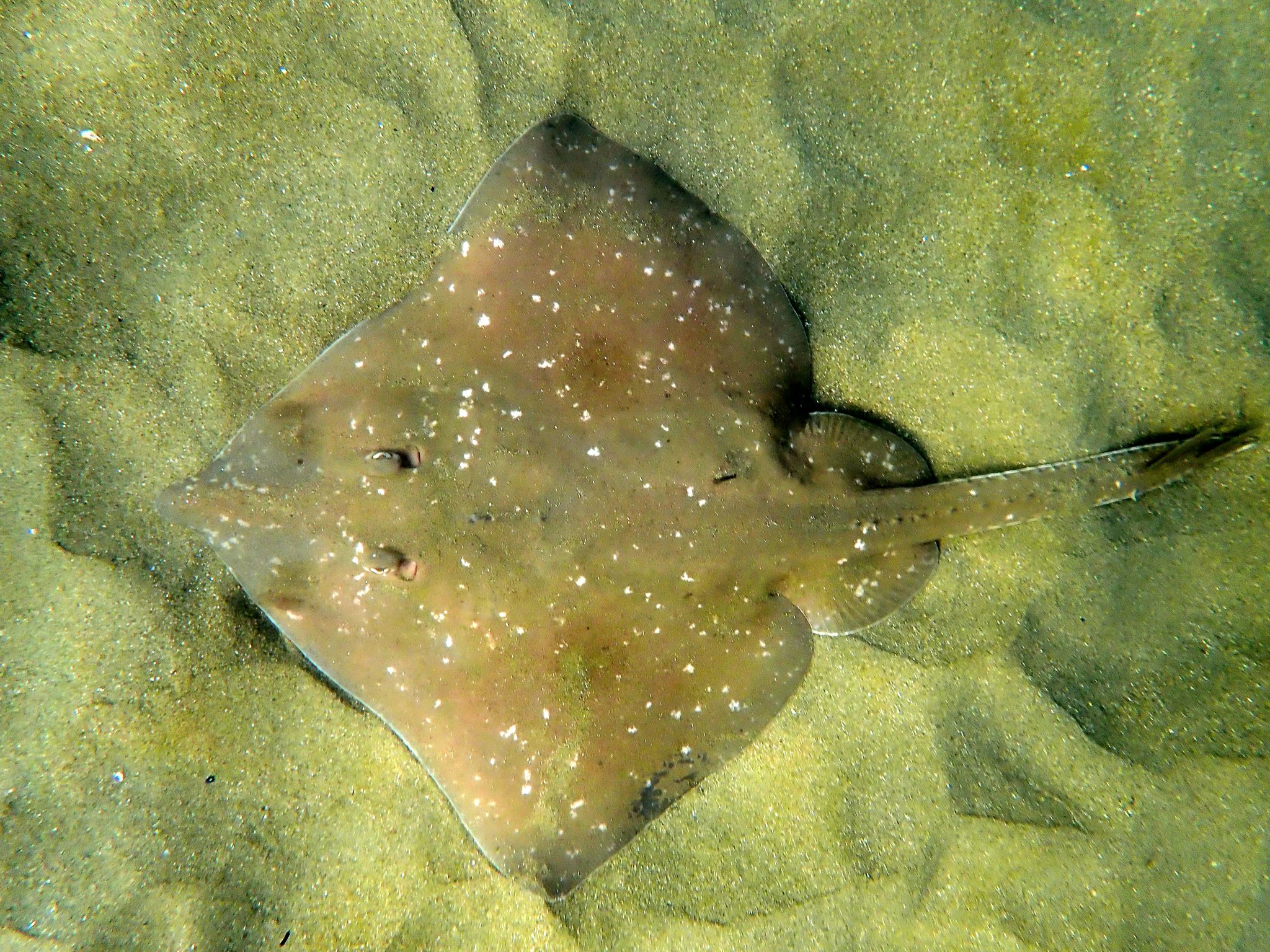

Conservation status
- Vulnerable (IUCN 3.1)

Scientific classification
- Kingdom: Animalia
- Phylum: Chordata
- Class: Chondrichthyes
- Subclass: Elasmobranchii
- Order: Rajiformes
- Family: Rajidae
- Genus: Spiniraja; Whitley, 1939
- Species: S. whitleyi

Binomial name
- Spiniraja whitleyi (Iredale, 1938)

Synonyms
- Dipturus whitleyi Raja whitleyi

= Melbourne skate =

Species of cartilaginous fish

The Melbourne skate (Spiniraja whitleyi) is a species of fish in the belonging to the skate family Rajidae. It is the only species in the genus Spiniraja. It is endemic to southern Australia. Its natural habitat is open seas. It is found at depths up to 345 meters.
