= Madagascar skate =

Conservation status
- Vulnerable (IUCN 3.1)

Scientific classification
- Kingdom: Animalia
- Phylum: Chordata
- Class: Chondrichthyes
- Subclass: Elasmobranchii
- Order: Rajiformes
- Family: Rajidae
- Genus: Dipturus
- Species: D. crosnieri

Binomial name
- Dipturus crosnieri (Séret, 1989)

Synonyms
- Raja (Dipturus) crosnieri Séret, 1989

Species of fish

The Madagascar skate (Dipturus crosnieri) is a species of fish in the family Rajidae. It is endemic to Madagascar and its natural habitat is open seas. It is threatened by habitat loss. The IUCN describes the species as "a relatively small (to at least 61 cm TL), poorly known, rare, deepwater skate with a limited distribution in the Western Indian Ocean off the west coast of Madagascar. [It is b]enthic on the continental slope at depths of 300 to 850 m. Virtually nothing is known of the biology of the species."
