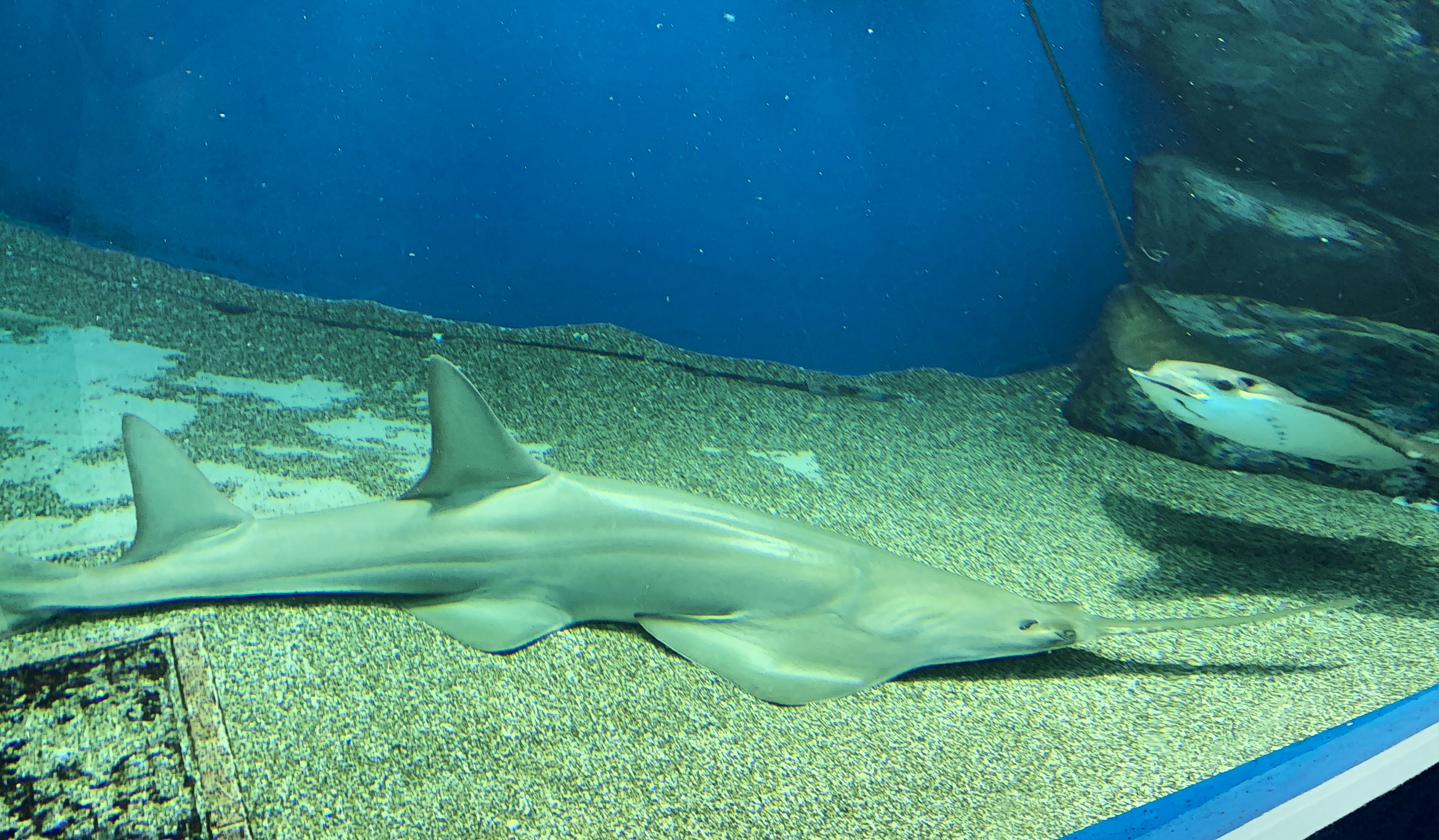

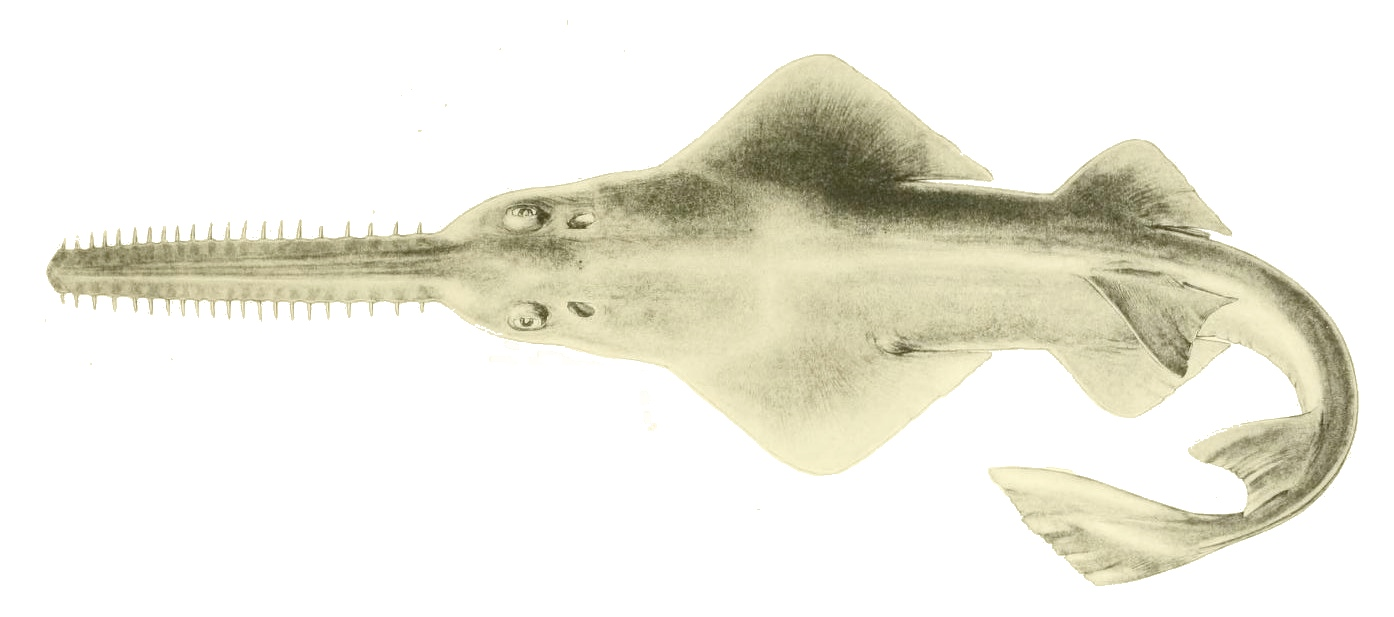
- Pristis clavata in the Maxell Aqua Park Shinagawa

Conservation status
- Critically Endangered (IUCN 3.1)
- CITES Appendix I

Scientific classification
- Kingdom: Animalia
- Phylum: Chordata
- Class: Chondrichthyes
- Subclass: Elasmobranchii
- Order: Rhinopristiformes
- Family: Pristidae
- Genus: Pristis
- Species: P. clavata

Binomial name
- Pristis clavata Garman, 1906

= Dwarf sawfish =

Species of cartilaginous fish

The dwarf sawfish or Queensland sawfish (Pristis clavata) is a sawfish of the family Pristidae, found in tropical Australia. This endangered species is the smallest species in its family.

== Description ==
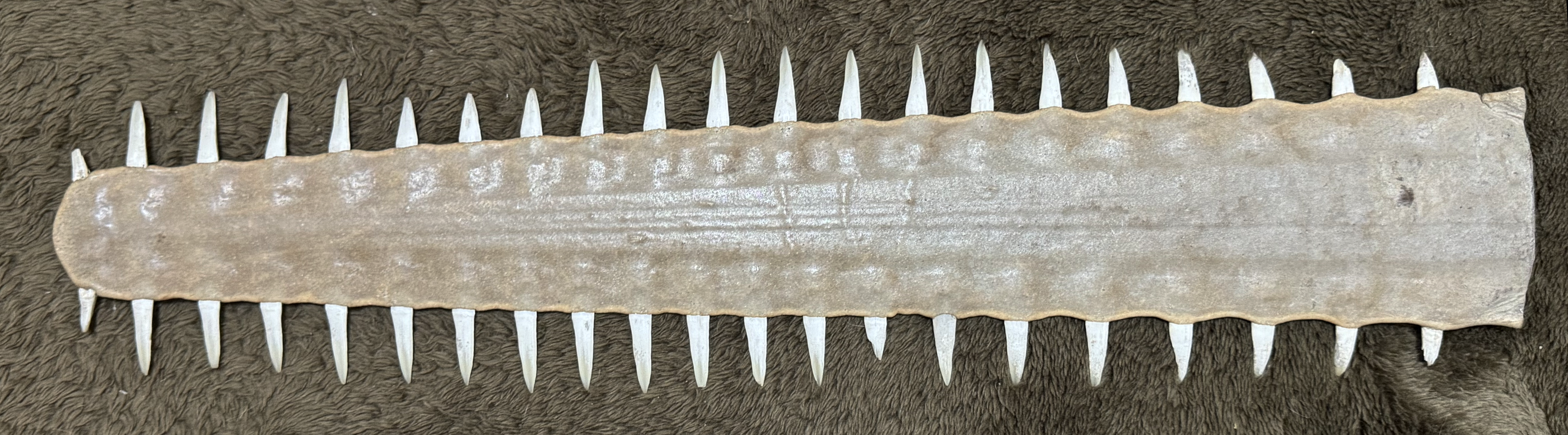
Rostrum

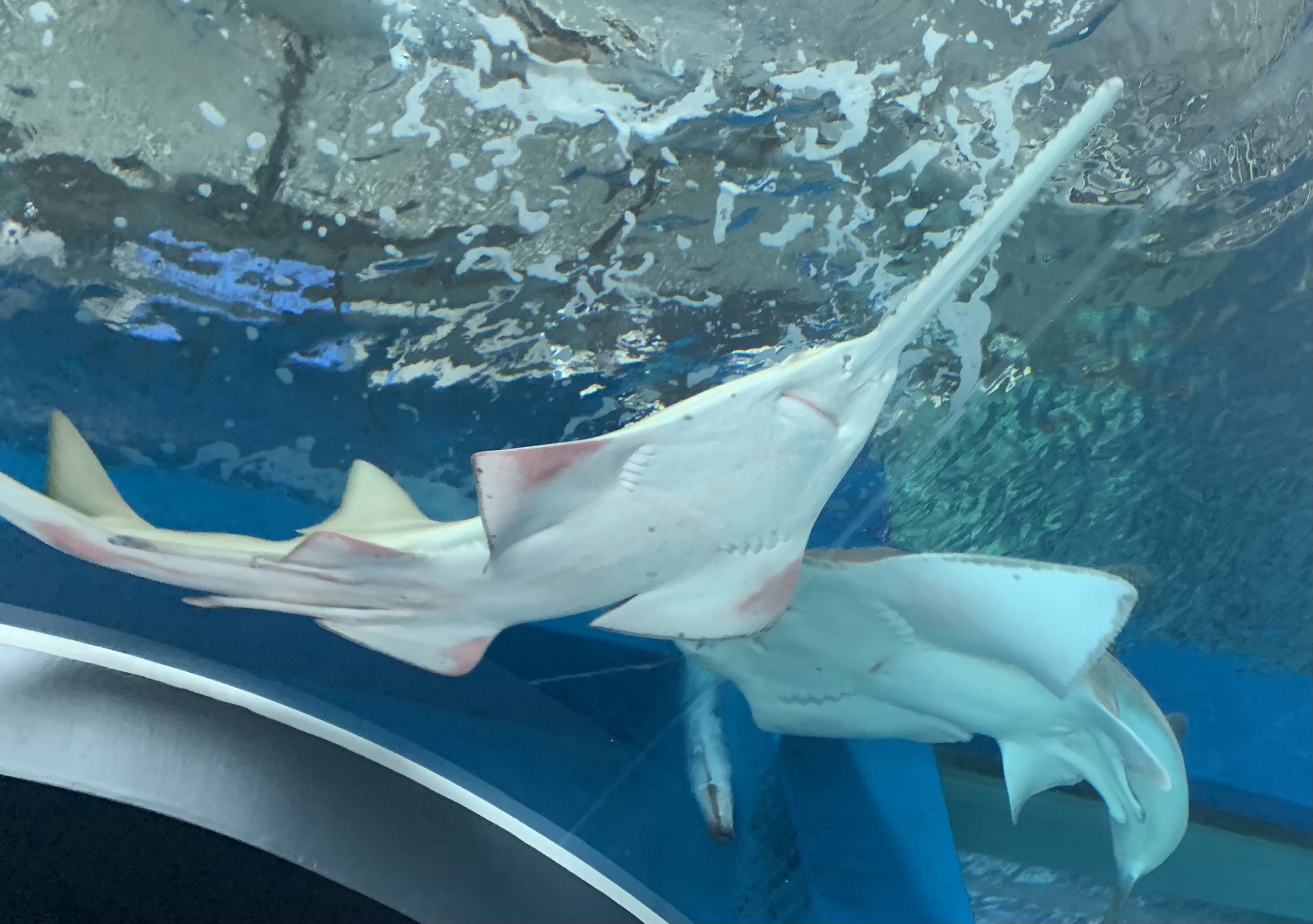
Ventral side of dwarf sawfish

The dwarf sawfish has a torpedo-shaped body that resembles that of a shark, and grows to a length of about 3.2 m (10.5 ft). It has broad, triangular pectoral fins and large, upright dorsal fins. The first dorsal fin is located directly above, or slightly behind, the origins of the pelvic fins, and the caudal fin has a very small lower lobe. The snout is broad and flat and is elongated into a rostrum with around twenty pairs of rostral teeth. The rostral teeth are rounded and lack the grooves seen in Largetooth sawfish, and if present, they are very small and limited. This fish is usually greenish-brown, or occasionally yellowish-brown, on its dorsal surface, and whitish underneath.

== Distribution and habitat ==
The dwarf sawfish is native to the western and central Indo-Pacific region and historically had a much wider range than it does now. Its present confirmed range is from southern New Guinea to the tropical region of northern Australia. A recorded sighting from the Canary Islands was probably of a different species. It typically inhabits inshore waters, estuaries, tidal mudflats and sometimes the lowest reaches of rivers.

== Ecology ==
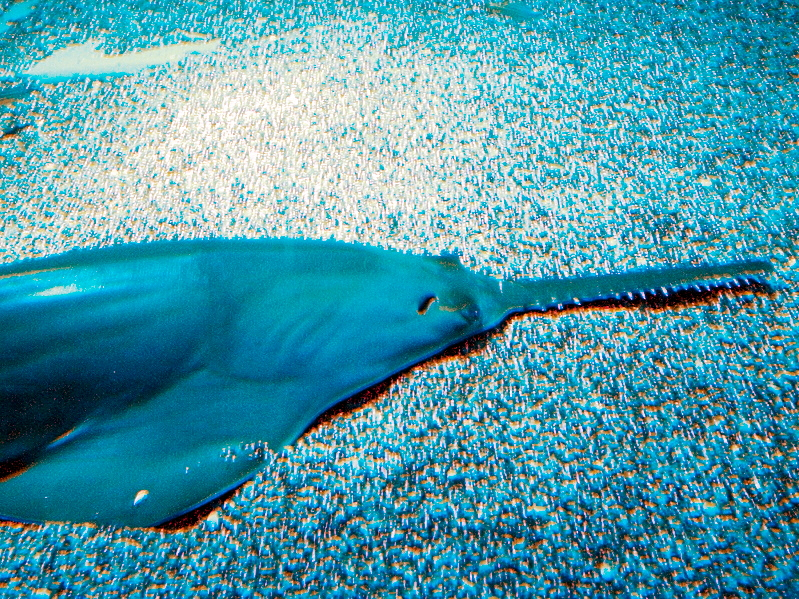
Dwarf sawfish head

This sawfish feeds mainly on fish, but also eats molluscs and crustaceans. The rostrum has large numbers of pores adapted for electroreception and is probably also used to manipulate prey. Its sensory input helps the fish move about in the muddy waters in which it often lives. Although they are sometimes found in deep water, most movements take place while the tide is either rising or falling, and movements during each tidal cycle may be up to 10 km (6.2 mi). At high tide the fish tend to forage and rest among the mangroves.

Little is known of the breeding habits of the dwarf sawfish. The fish are ovoviviparous with the developing embryos feeding on the yolks of their eggs. It is not known how many young can be carried at one time nor how frequently the fish can breed, but the young are about 65 cm (26 in) long when they are born. Maximum longevity in this species is estimated to be forty-eight years.

== Status ==
The dwarf sawfish is protected in Australian waters, but elsewhere in the world, sawfishes are harvested for their meat, fins, rostrums and oil. The main threat facing the dwarf sawfish is being caught as bycatch in gillnets and trawl nets. That this is the cause of declining numbers is demonstrated by the fact that populations are declining fastest in heavily fished areas. The International Union for Conservation of Nature has assessed the conservation status of this fish as "critically endangered". There is a need for education of fishermen about safe release practices and how to manage their fisheries. However, the threats are continuing, and there is no reason to believe that the population of dwarf sawfish is recovering from previous declines.

Due to the decrease in the number of individuals, this species is rarely stored in aquariums, and as of 2021, 2 individuals (1 male and 1 female) are in kept in the Japanese public aquarium Aqua Park Shinagawa.

== See also ==
- List of threatened rays
