= List of endangered animals in India =

India's Red List of 2018 was released at the Rio+20 Earth Summit. Since then, new animals have been added yearly. While previously this list contained 132 species of plants and animals in 2018, as of the 2023-1 update from the IUCN Red List, over 950 species of animals (and over 600 species of plants) are listed as critically endangered, endangered, or vulnerable. In 2024, 7 plant species and 8 animal species were added as critically endangered with 1 plant species, Limnophila limnophiloides, listed as extinct. In 2025, as of October 21, 13 more animal species (and 13 plant species) were added as critically endangered.

== Critically endangered animals ==
Listed by the IUCN as of the 2023-1 update.

=== Arachnids (2) ===
- Rameshwaram parachute spider (Poecilotheria hanumavilasumica)
- Peacock tarantula (Poecilotheria metallia)

=== Birds (19) ===
- Great Indian bustard (Ardeotis nigriceps)
- White-bellied heron (Ardea insignis)
- Baer's pochard (Aythya baeri)
- Spoon-billed sandpiper (Calidris pygmaea)
- Yellow-breasted bunting (Emberiza aureola)
- Siberian crane (Grus leucogeranus)
- White-rumped vulture (Gyps bengalensis)
- Indian vulture (Gyps indicus)
- Slender-billed vulture (Gyps tenuirostris)
- Masked finfoot (Heliopais personatus)
- Bengal florican (Houbaropsis bengalensis)
- Bugun liocichla (Liocichla bugunorum)
- Himalayan quail (Ophrysia superciliosa)
- Jerdon's courser (Rhinoptilus bitorquatus)
- Manipur bush-quail (Perdicula manipurensis)
- Narcondam hornbill (Rhyticero)
- Pink-headed duck (Rhodonessa caryophyllacea)
- Red-headed vulture (Sarcogyps calvus)
- Lesser florican (Sypheotides indicus)
- Sociable lapwing (Vanellus gregarius)
- White-winged duck (Asarcornis scutulata)

=== Cnidaria (1) ===
- Millepora boschmai possibly extinct

=== Fish (44) ===
- Stripenose guitarfish (Acroteriobatus variegatus)
- Knifetooth sawfish (Anoxypristis cuspidata)
- Wayanad mahseer (Barbodes wynaadensis)
- Pondicherry shark (Carcharhinus hemiodon)
- Oceanic whitetip shark (Carcharhinus longimanus)
- Sand tiger shark (Carcharias taurus)
- Dwarf gulper shark (Centrophorus atromarginatus)
- Indian swellshark (Cephaloscyllium silasi)
- Garra arunachalami
- Sharpnose guitarfish (Glaucostegus granulatus)
- Halavi guitarfish (Glaucostegus halavi)
- Widenose guitarfish (Glaucostegus obtusus)
- Clubnose guitarfish (Glaucostegus thouin)
- Giant guitarfish (Glaucostegus typus)
- Ganges shark (Glyphis gangeticus)
- Glyptothorax kashmirensis
- Kudremukh glyptothorax (Glyptothorax kudremukhensis)
- Tentacled butterfly ray (Gymnura tentaculata)
- Nilgiri mystus (Hemibagrus punctatus) possibly extinct
- Horalabiosa arunachalami
- Haragi (Hypselobarbus pulchellus)
- Red Canarese barb (Hypselobarbus thomassi)
- Pakistan whipray (Maculabatis arabica)
- Shorttail whipray (Maculabatis bineeshi)
- Mesonoemacheilus herrei
- Bovany barb (Neolissochilus bovanicus)
- Deolali minnow (Parapsilorhynchus prateri) possibly extinct
- Pookode Lake barb (Pethia pookodensis)
- Pinniwallago kanpurensis possibly extinct
- Dwarf sawfish (Pristis clavata)
- Common sawfish (Pristis pristis)
- Largetooth sawfish (Pristis microdon)
- Longcomb sawfish (Pristis zijsron)
- Psilorhynchus tenura
- Deccan barb (Puntius deccanensis) possibly extinct
- Puntius madhusoodani
- Schistura papulifera
- Bowmouth guitarfish (Rhina ancylostoma)
- Bengal guitarfish (Rhinobatos annandalei)
- Smoothback guitarfish (Rhinobatos lionotus)
- Bottlenose wedgefish (Rhynchobatus australiae)
- Smoothnose wedgefish (Rhynchobatus laevis)
- Scalloped hammerhead (Sphyrna lewini)
- Great hammerhead (Sphyrna mokaran)
- Hump-back mahseer (Tor remadevii)
- Triplophysa kashmirensis

=== Insects (2) ===
- Pygmy hog-suckin' louse (Haematopinus oliveri)
- Protostica myristicaensis

=== Mammals (11) ===
- Namdapha flying squirrel (Biswamoyopterus biswasi)
- Kashmir stag or hangul (Cervus canadensis hanglu)
- Elvira rat (Cremnomys elvira)
- Andaman shrew (Crocidura andamanensis)
- Jenkins' shrew (Crocidura jenkinsi)
- Nicobar shrew (Crocidura nicobarica)
- Sumatran rhinoceros (Dicerorhinus sumatrensis)
- Chinese pangolin (Manis pentadactyla)
- Javan rhinoceros (Rhinoceros sondaicus)
- Malabar large-spotted civet (Viverra civettina) possibly extinct

=== Reptiles and amphibians (59) ===
- Dehradun stream frog (Amolops chakrataensis)
- Madras spotted skink (Barkudia insularis)
- Northern river terrapin (Batagur baska)
- Three-striped roofed turtle (Batagur dhongoka)
- Red-crowned roofed turtle (Batagur kachuga)
- Khasi hill rock toad (Bufoides meghalaynus)
- Adi's day gecko (Cnemaspis adii)
- Cnemaspis anaikattiensis
- Kottiyoor day gecko (Cnemaspis kottiyoorensis)
- Cnemaspis shevaroyensis
- Thackeray's dwarf gecko (Cnemaspis thackerayi)
- Chamba bent-toed gecko (Cyrtodactylus chamba)
- Cyrtodactylus montanus
- Hawksbill sea turtle (Eretmochelys imbricata)
- Ghats wart frog (Fejervarya murthii)
- Gharial (Gavialis gangeticus)
- Jeypore ground gecko (Geckoella jeyporensis)
- Satara gecko (Hemidactylus sataraensis)
- Southern Ghats slender gecko (Hemiphyllodactylus aurantiacus)
- Hemiphyllodactylus kolliensis
- Gundia Indian frog (Indirana gundia)
- Toad-skinned frog (Indirana phrynoderma)
- Yellow-headed tortoise (Indotestudo elongata)
- Leptolalax khasiorum
- Nagaland Asian toad (Leptobrachella lateralis)
- Asian forest tortoise (Manouria emys)
- Dzukou valley horned frog (Megophrys dzukou)
- Garo white-lipped horned frog (Megophrys oreocrypta)
- Rao's torrt frog (Micrixalus kottigeharensis)
- Spotted dancing frog (Micrixalus specca)
- Cave dancing frog (Micrixalus spelunca)
- Charles Darwin's frog (Minervarya charlesdarwini)
- Franky's narrow-mouthed frog (Mysticellus franki)
- Nasikabatrachus bhupathi
- Leith's softshell turtle (Nilssonia leithii)
- Black softshell turtle (Nilssonia nigricans)
- Dattatreya night frog (Nyctibatrachus dattatreyaensis)
- Indraneil's night frog (Nyctibatrachus indraneili)
- Assam roofed turtle (Pangshura sylhetensis)
- Cantor's giant softshell turtle (Pelochelys cantorii)
- Tura bubble-nest frog (Philautus kempiae)
- Kobo bubble-nest frog (Philautus microdiscus)
- Sacred grove bushfrog (Philautus sanctisilvaticus)
- Amboli bush frog (Pseudophilautus amboli)
- Raorchestes aureus
- White-spotted bush frog (Raorchestes chalazodes)
- Green eyed bushfrog (Raorchestes chlorosomma)
- Griet bush frog (Raorchestes griet)
- Kaikatti bushfrog (Raorchestes kaikatti)
- Mark's bushfrog (Raorchestes marki)
- Munnar bush frog (Raorchestes munnarensis)
- Ponmudi bush frog (Raorchestes ponmudi)
- Raorchestes primarrumpfi
- Resplendent shrubfrog (Raorchestes resplendens)
- Shillong bubble-nest frog (Raorchestes shillongensis)
- Anaimalai flying frog (Rhacophorus pseudomalabaricus)
- Sushil's bushfrog (Raorchestes sushili)
- Rinophis goweri
- Superb large fan-throated lizard (Sarada superba)
- Spiny lazy toad (Scutiger spinosus)
- Island pit viper (Trimeresurus labialis)
- Shevaroy hills earth snake (Uropeltis shorttii)
- Amboli toad (Xanthophryne tigerina)
- Ghats wart frog (Zakerana murthii)

== Endangered ==
Listed by the IUCN as of the 2023-1 update.

=== Arachnids (4) ===
- Haploclastus kayi
- Poecilotheria formosa
- Poecilotheria miranda
- Poecilotheria rufilata

=== Birds (20) ===
- Forest owlet (Athene blewitti)
- Steppe eagle (Aquila nipalensis)
- Great knot (Calidris tenuirostris)
- Oriental stork (Ciconia boyciana)
- Saker falcon (Falco cherrug)
- Pallas's fish-eagle (Haliaeetus leucoryphus)
- Swamp grass babbler (Laticlla cinerascens)
- Niligiri chilappan (Montecincla cachinnans)
- Banasura chilappan (Montecincla jerdoniI)
- Egyptian vulture (Neophron percnopterus)
- White-headed duck (Oxyura leucocephala)
- Green peafowl (Pavo muticus)
- Finn's weaver (Ploceus megarhynchus)
- Indian skimmer (Rynchops albicollis)
- Nordmann's greenshank (Tringa guttifer)
- Black-chinned laughingthrush (Trochalopteron jerdoni)
- Great nicobar serpant-eagle (Spilornis klossi)
- Black-bellied tern (Sterna acuticauda)

=== Cnidaria (4) ===
- Acropora rudis
- Anacropora spinsosa
- Parasimplastrea sheppardi
- Porites desilveri

=== Crustacean (2) ===
- Arachnochium kulsiense
- Macrobrachium lamarrei lamarroides

=== Echinoderm (4) ===
- Holothuria lessoni
- Holothuria nobilis
- Holothuria scabra
- Pineapple seacucumber (Thelenota ananas)

=== Fish (from 2018 - 135 as of 2023) ===
- Asian arowana (Scleropages formosus)
- Red line torpedo barb (Sahyadria denisonii)
- Golden mahaseer (Tor putitora)
- Deccan labeo (Labeo potail)

=== Insects (4) ===
- Ludlow's Bhutan glory (Bhutanitis ludlowi)
- Idionyx galeata
- Libellago balus
- Orthetrum andamanicum

=== Mammals (55) ===
- Red panda (Ailurus fulgens)
- Hog deer (Axis porcinus)
- Sei whale (Balaenoptera borealis)
- Blue whale (Balaenoptera musculus)
- Fin whale (Balaenoptera physalus)
- Banteng (Bos javanicus)
- Wild water buffalo (Bubalus arnee)
- Hispid hare (Caprolagus hispidus)
- Dhole (Cuon alpinus)
- Asian elephant (Elephas maximus)
- Indian elephant (Elephas maximus indicus)
- Onager (Equus hemionus)
- Woolly flying squirrel (Eupetaurus cinereus)
- Kelaart's long-clawed shrew (Feroculus feroculus)
- Manipur bush rat (Hadromys humei)
- Kolar leaf-nosed bat (Hipposideros hypophyllus)
- Nicobar leaf nosed bat (Hipposideros nicobarulae)
- Pomona roundleaf bat (Hipposideros pomona)
- Western hoolock gibbon (Hoolock hoolock)
- Mishmi hills hoolock gibbon (Hoolock hoolock mishmiensis)
- Salim Ali's fruit bat (Latidens salimalii)
- Eurasian lynx (Lynx lynx)
- White-cheeked macaque (Macaca leucogenys)
- Arunachal macaque (Macaca munzala)
- Lion-tailed macaque (Macaca silenus)
- Indian pangolin (Manis crassicaudata)
- Humpback whale (Megaptera novaeangliae)
- Kondana soft-furred rat (Millardia kondana)
- Kashmir musk deer (Moschus cupreus)
- Alpine musk deer (Moschus chrysogaster)
- Black musk deer (Moschus fuscus)
- White-bellied musk deer (Moschus leucogaster)
- Servant mouse (Mus famulus)
- Mandelli's mouse-eared bat (Myotis sicarius)
- Nilgiri tahr (Nilgiritragus hylocrius)
- Bengal slow loris (Nycticebus bengalensis)
- Irrawaddy dolphin (Orcaella brevirostris)
- Asiatic lion (Panthera leo persica)
- Bengal tiger (Panthera tigris tigris)
- Ganges river dolphin (Platanista gangetica)
- Indus river dolphin (Platanista minor)
- Pygmy hog (Porcula salvania)
- Nicobar flying fox (Pteropus faunulus)
- Nonsense rat (Rattus burrus)
- Kerala rat (Rattus ranjiniae)
- Andaman horseshoe bat (Rhinolophus cognatus)
- Sangai (Rucervus eldii)
- Kashmir gray langur (Semnopithecus ajax)
- Indian Ocean humpback dolphin (Sousa plumbea)
- Day's shrew (Suncus dayi)
- Gee's golden langur (Trachypithecus geei)
- Phayre's leaf-monkey (Trachypithecus phayrei)
- Tenebrous capped langur (Trachypithecus pileatus tenebricus)
- Blond-bellied langur (Trachypithecus pileatus pileatus)
- Nicobar treeshrew (Tupaia nicobarica)
- Nilgiri long-tailed tree mouse (Vandeleuria nilagirica)

=== Mollusk (3) ===
- Cremnoconchus carinatus
- Cremnoconchus syhadrensis
- Pseudomulleria dalyi

=== Reptiles and amphibians (from 2018 - 122 as of 2023) ===
- Perrotet's vine snake (Ahaetulla perroteti)
- Green turtle (Chelonia mydas)
- Indian narrow-headed softshell turtle (Chitra indica)
- Goan day gecko (Cnemaspis goaensis)
- Wyanad day gecko (Cnemaspis wynadensis)
- Keeled box turtle (Cuora mouhotii)
- Boulenger's dasia (Dasia subcaerulea)
- Poona skink (Eurylepis poonaensis)
- Inger's mabuya (Eutropis clivicola)
- Indian kangaroo lizard (Otocryptis beddomii)
- Travancore Hills thorntail snake (Platyplectrurus madurensis)
- Travancore earth snake (Rhinophis travancoricus)
- Cochin forest cane turtle (Vijayachelys silvatica)

== Vulnerable ==
Listed by the IUCN As of 2012. As of the 2023-1 update, there are 481 animals listed as vulnerable.

=== Birds ===
- Christmas Island frigatebird (Fregata andrewsi)
- Sarus crane (Antigone)
- Nicobar megapode (Megapodius nicobariensis)
- Dalmatian pelican (Pelecanus crispus)

=== Mammals ===
- Cheetah (Acinonyx jubatus)
- Brown bear (Ursus arctos)
- Capped langur (Trachypithecus pileatus brahma)
- Gaur (Bos gaurus)
- Four-horned antelope or chousingha (Tetracerus quadricornis)
- Leopard (Panthera pardus)
- Oriental small-clawed otter (Aonyx cinerea)
- White-chested bear (Ursus thibetanus)
- Yak (Bos grunhniens)
- Takin (Budorcas taxicolor)
- Barasingha (Rucervus duvaucelii)
- Clouded leopard (Neofelis nebulosa)
- Dugong (Dugong dugon)
- Sun bear (Helarctos malayanus)
- Stump-tailed macaque (Macaca arctoides)
- Marbled cat (Pardofelis marmorata)
- Sperm whale (Physeter macrocephalus)
- Rusty-spotted cat (Prionailurus rubiginosus)
- Indian rhinoceros (Rhinoceros unicornis)
- Snow leopard (Uncia uncia)
- Nilgiri marten (Martes gwatkinsii)
- Sloth bear (Melursus ursinus)

=== Reptiles and amphibians ===
- Olive ridley sea turtle (Lepidochelys olivacea)

== See also ==
- Critically endangered
- Endangered mammals of India
- Endangered species
- Fauna of India
- List of amphibians of India
- List of Asian animals extinct in the Holocene
- List of birds of India
- List of endemic and threatened plants of India
- List of mammals of India
- List of reptiles of South Asia
- Lists of extinct species
- Vulnerable species
