= Wayanad (disambiguation) =

Wayanad is a district in Kerala, India.

Wayanad or Wynaad may also refer to:

- Wayanad Lok Sabha constituency, in Kerala
- Wayanad Wildlife Sanctuary, in Kerala
- Wynad day gecko, a lizard
- Wayanad laughingthrush (Pterorhinus delesserti), a bird
- Wynaad Insurrection or the Cotiote War, a war in colonial India
