= Nilgiris kaduva =

Animals in Nilgiris, south India

The Nilgiris kaduva (also known as "Nilgiris tiger" or (Tamil- naai-puli) is a rare creature found in the forest regions of Kerala and Tamil Nadu. It is believed to inhabit an area within a 150-kilometer radius centered on the Western Ghats. The animal possesses a body resembling that of a tiger and a face similar to that of a dog. It is referred to as "naai-puli" (literally "dog-tiger") because it is known to prey on dogs.

== History ==
See also: List of endangered animals in India

In 2014, a rare type of tiger-like creature known as the "Nilgiris Kaduva" was discovered in South India. It is similar in size to a tiger. The Nilgiris Kaduva was identified by scientist and conservation biologist Dijo Thomas, who provided scientific evidence for its existence. Because it resembles a prehistoric animal, it has been described as a "living fossil." According to Dijo Thomas’s findings, the Nilgiris Kaduva (Nilgiris Tiger) is considered a common ancestor to both the feline (cat) and canine (dog) families. Although it looks like a tiger, it surprisingly possesses the face of a dog; interestingly, dogs also happen to be its primary prey. It belongs to the Nilgiri Kaduva family and is currently at a high risk of total extinction. Dijo Thomas has identified over 15 locations across the South Indian states of Kerala, Tamil Nadu, and Karnataka where the Nilgiris Kaduva can still be found. Its total population across these three states is estimated to be between 40 and 80 individuals. In 2018 and 2019, he also searched for the creature in Andhra Pradesh and Telangana. While he learned that it once existed in those regions, he could not confirm whether it is still present there today.

== See also ==
- Nilgiri Mountains
- Tamil Nadu
