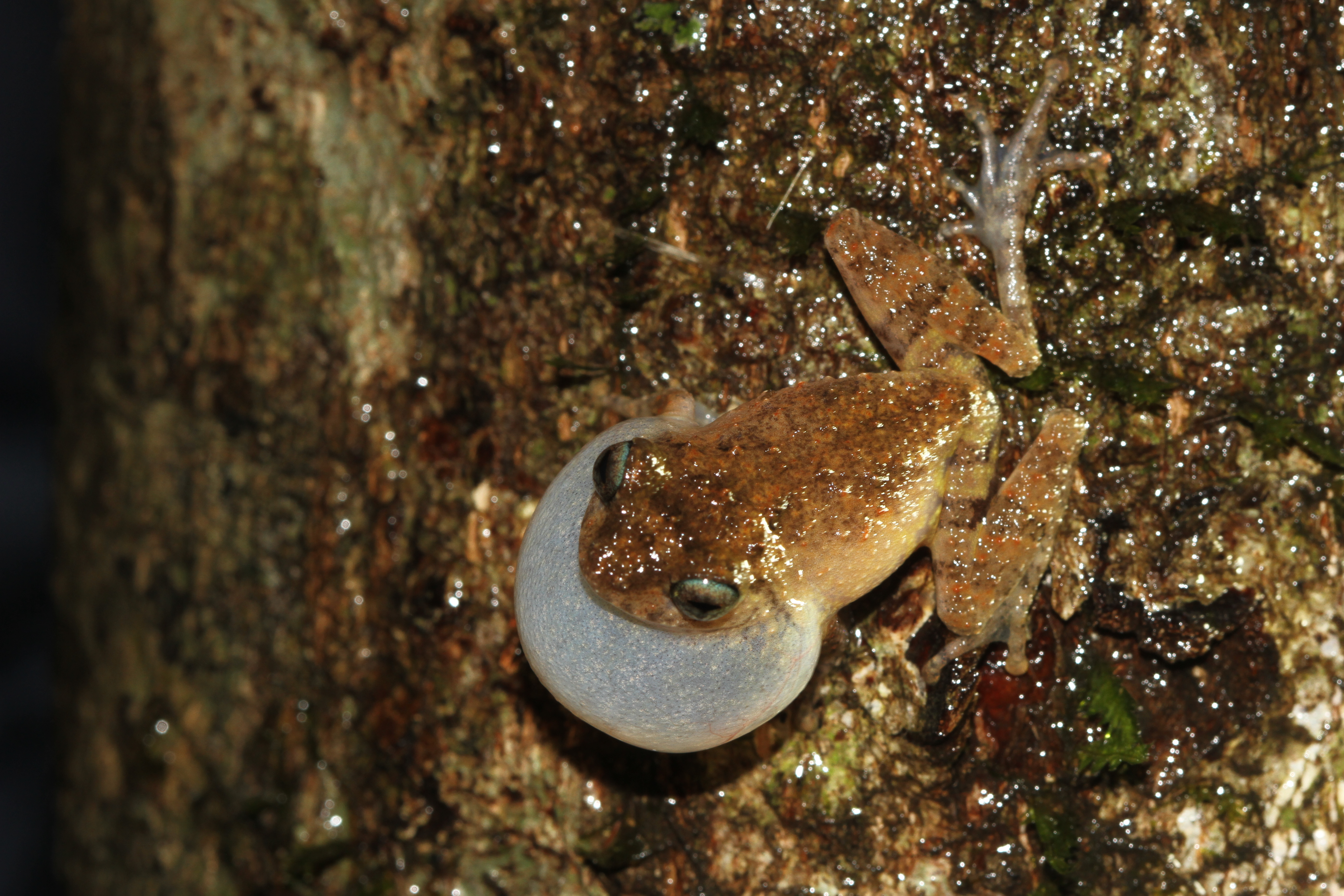

Conservation status
- Vulnerable (IUCN 3.1)

Scientific classification
- Kingdom: Animalia
- Phylum: Chordata
- Class: Amphibia
- Order: Anura
- Family: Rhacophoridae
- Genus: Raorchestes
- Species: R. graminirupes

Binomial name
- Raorchestes graminirupes (Biju & Bossuyt, 2005)

Synonyms
- Philautus graminirupes Biju & Bossuyt, 2005

= Raorchestes graminirupes =

Species of frog

Raorchestes graminirupes is a species of frog in the family Rhacophoridae. It is endemic to the Western Ghats, India. Scientists know it exclusively from the type locality: Palmudi in the Western Ghat mountains, between 1030 and 1300 meters above sea level.

Its natural habitats are grassland and shrubland, though it has also been found in forests and gardens and by roadsides. Scientists have observed this frog sitting on plants near the ground. The female frog lays eggs in cracks in rocks or near grass. This frog breeds through direct development.

Scientists classify this frog as at least concern of extinction because even though its range is not very large, only small parts of that range are subject to degradation and because the frog seems to survive well in disturbed habitats. Scientists cite climate change as a possible future threat to this species.
