= Franky Bossuyt =

- Born: Belgium
- Education: Vrije Universiteit Brussel
- Known for: Amphibian evolution; description of multiple frog taxa from South and Southeast Asia
- Scientific career
- Fields: Herpetology
- Workplaces: Vrije Universiteit Brussel

Franky Bossuyt is a Belgian herpetologist. Bossuyt is professor at the Vrije Universiteit Brussel, where he leads the Amphibian Evolution Lab.

He described multiple frog taxa from South and Southeast Asia. His 2003 discovery of the purple frog Nasikabatrachus sahyadrensis was called by Nature a “ once-in-a-century discovery”.

He is involved in research into the evolution of frogs.

In 2019 a frog species, the Mysticellus franki, was named in honor of him.

== Taxa described ==
Bossuyt has described or co-described numerous amphibian taxa, including:

- Ghatixalus
- Ghatixalus asterops
- Nasikabatrachidae
- Nasikabatrachus
- Nasikabatrachus sahyadrensis
- Nyctibatrachus minimus
- Philautus akroparallagi
- Philautus amboli
- Philautus anili
- Philautus bobingeri
- Philautus chotta
- Philautus chlorosomma
- Philautus chromasynchysi
- Philautus coonoorensis
- Philautus dubois
- Philautus graminirupes
- Philautus griet
- Philautus jayarami
- Philautus kaikatti
- Philautus kani
- Philautus marki
- Philautus munnarensis
- Philautus nerostagona
- Philautus ponmudi
- Philautus sushili
