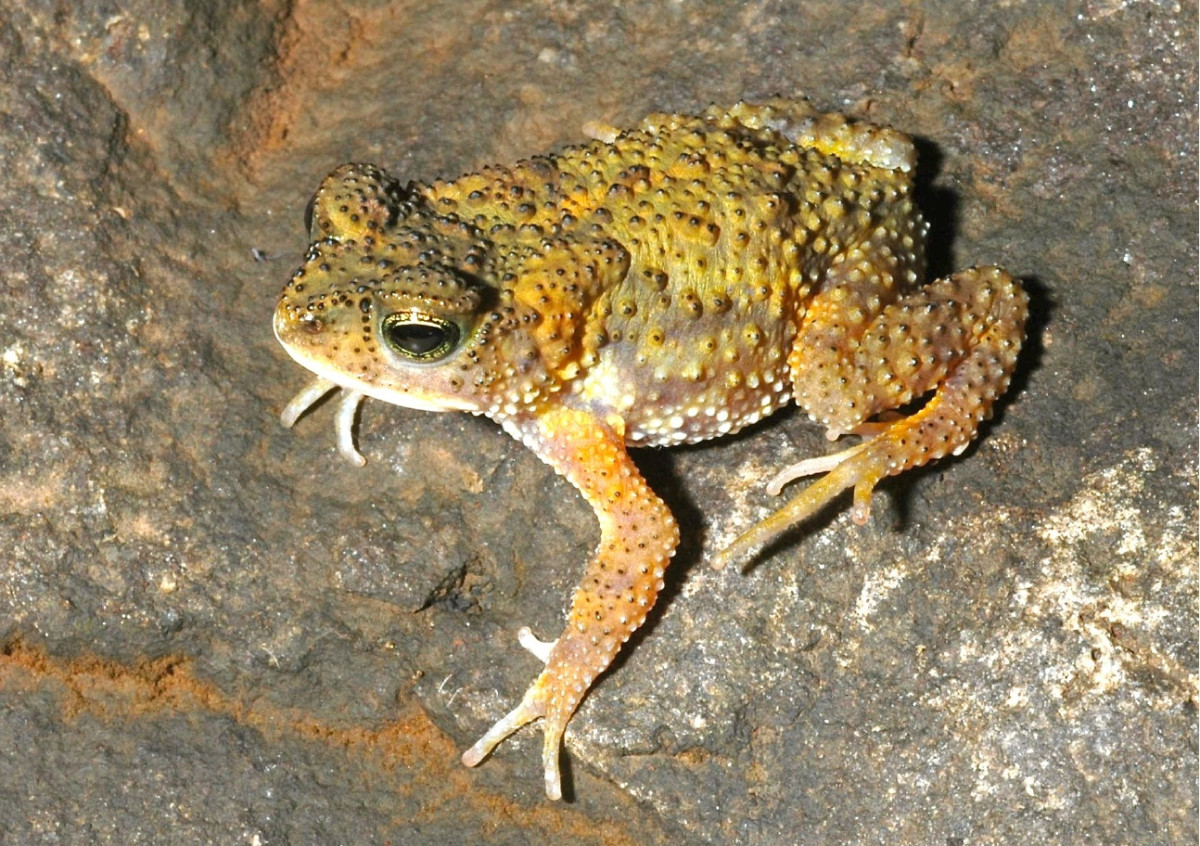
- Type species, Koyna toad (Beduka koynayensis)

Scientific classification
- Kingdom: Animalia
- Phylum: Chordata
- Class: Amphibia
- Order: Anura
- Family: Bufonidae
- Genus: Beduka; Dubois, Ohler, and Pyron, 2021

Type species
- Bufo koynayensis Soman, 1963

Diversity
- 2 species (see text)

Synonyms
- Xanthophryne Biju, Van Bocxlaer, Giri, Loader, and Bossuyt, 2009

= Beduka =

Genus of amphibians

Beduka is a small genus of toads in the family Bufonidae, sometimes referred to with the common name, lateritic toads. They are endemic to the Western Ghats in Maharashtra, India. Its sister taxon was previously regarded to be Duttaphrynus, but the newly established Firouzophrynus genus falls between the two. The name Beduka is the Marathi word for toad.

== Taxonomy ==
Beduka subsumed Xanthophryne in 2021, following several issues arising with the latter taxon: 1) Xanthophryne is unavailable as a nomenclature due to International Code of Zoological Nomenclature rules for taxa published online, and 2) the presence of a genus Xanthophryne would render Firouzophrynus paraphyletic.

== Description ==
Beduka are relatively small toads: adult males measure 24–33 mm (0.94–1.30 in) and females 33–35 mm (1.3–1.4 in) in snout–vent length. They have light brown dorsum with a suffusion of dull chrome-yellow; flanks and sides of the abdomen have chrome-yellow patches, sometimes a few continuous bands. The tympanum is indistinct. There is no webbing between the toes and fingers. Eggs are laid in clutches.

== Species ==
There are two species in this genus:

- Beduka koynayensis (Soman, 1963)
- Beduka amboli Dubois, Ohler, and Pyron, 2021
