= Endangered mammals of India =

"Endangered mammals in India listed by IUCN"

Endangered mammals of India are the mammal species in India that are listed as threatened in the International Union for Conservation of Nature and Natural Resources (IUCN) Red List of Threatened Animals

== Background ==
In India, mammals comprise 410 species, 186 genera, 45 families and 13 orders of which nearly 89 species are listed as threatened in the International Union for Conservation of Nature and Natural Resources (IUCN) Red List of Threatened Animals (IUCN 2006). This includes two species that are locally extinct from India viz. Acinonyx jubatus and Rhinoceros sondaicus.

The mammals are the class of vertebrate animals characterized by the presence of mammary glands, which in females produce milk for the nourishment of young; the presence of hair or fur; specialized teeth; the presence of a neocortex region in the brain; and endothermic or "warm-blooded" bodies. The brain regulates endothermic and circulatory system, including a four-chambered heart. Mammals encompass some 5,500 species (including Humans), distributed in about 1,200 genera, 152 families and up to 46 orders, though this varies with the classification scheme.

== Endangered mammals ==
- Asiatic golden cat (Catopuma temmincki)
- Asiatic lion (Panthera leo persica)
- Indian wild ass or Khur (Equus hemionus khur)
- Asiatic wild dog / Dhole (Cuon alpinus)
- Asiatic black bear (Ursus thibetanus)
- Bengal tiger (Panthera tigris tigris)
- Banteng (Bos javanicus)
- Brow-antlered deer (Panolia eldi eldi)
- Himalayan Brown bear (Ursus arctos isabellinus)
- Jerdon's palm civet (Paradoxurus jerdoni)
- Asian short-clawed otter (Amblonyx cinereus)
- Clouded leopard (Neofelis nebulosa)
- Common otter (Lutra lutra)
- Asiatic wildcat (Felis lybica ornata)
- Dugong / Seacow (Dugong dugon)
- Ganges river dolphin (Platanista gangetica)
- Gaur (Bos gaurus)
- Golden langur (Trachypithecus geei)
- Goral (Nemorhaedus goral)
- Indian rhinoceros (Rhinoceros unicornis)
- Indian wolf (Canis lupus pallipes)
- Himalayan marten (Martes flavigula)
- Himalayan musk deer (Moschus chrysogaster)
- Sikkim large-clawed shrew (Soriculus nigrescens)
- Hispid hare (Caprolagus hispidus)
- Hoolock gibbon (Hoolock hoolock)
- Indian elephant (Elephas maximus indicus)
- Golden jackal (Canis aureus)
- Kashmir stag / Hangul (Cervus affinis hanglu)
- Indian leopard (Panthera pardus fusca)
- Lion-tailed macaque (Macaca silenus)
- Malabar civet (Viverra civettina)
- Marbled cat (Pardofelis marmorata)
- Nilgiri langur (Presbytis johni)
- Nilgiri marten (Martes gwatkinsi)
- Nilgiri tahr (Hemitragus hylocrius)
- Pygmy hog (Porcula salvania)
- Hill fox (Vulpes vulpes montana)
- Red panda (Ailurus fulgens)
- Rusty-spotted cat (Prionailurus rubiginosa)
- Serow (Nemorhaedus sumatraensis)
- Sloth bear (Melursus ursinus ursinus)
- Smooth Indian otter (Lutrogale perspicillata)
- Snow leopard (Panthera uncia)
- Stump-tailed macaque (Macaca arctoides)
- Swamp deer/ Barasingha (Rusa duvauceli duvauceli)
- Takin (Budorcas taxicolor)
- Tibetan wild ass (Equus kiang)

== See also ==
- List of endangered animals in India
- Fauna of India
- Mammals of India
