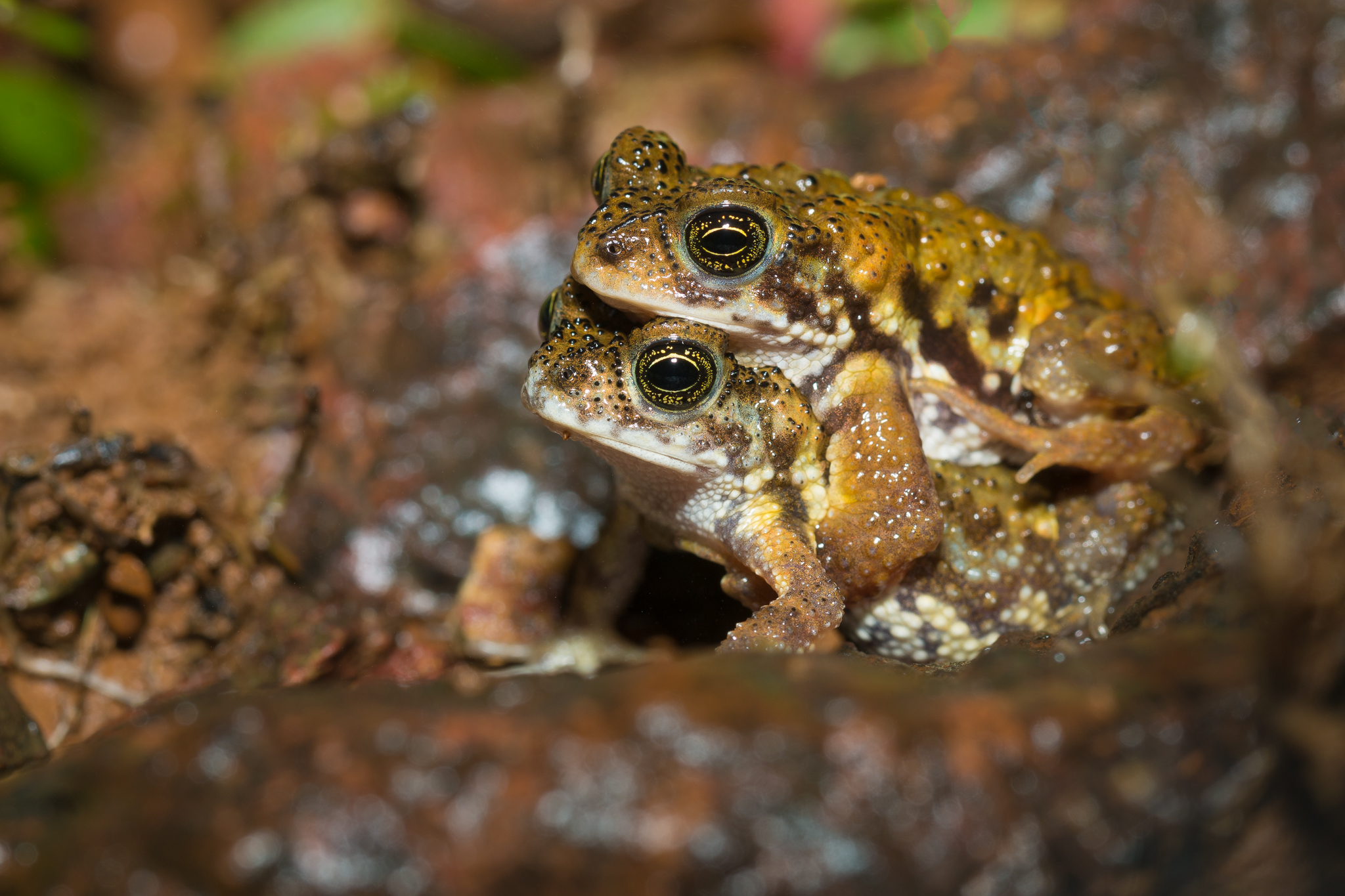
- Pair engaged in amplexus

Conservation status
- Endangered (IUCN 3.1)

Scientific classification
- Kingdom: Animalia
- Phylum: Chordata
- Class: Amphibia
- Order: Anura
- Family: Bufonidae
- Genus: Beduka
- Species: B. amboli

Binomial name
- Beduka amboli Dubois, Ohler, and Pyron, 2021

Synonyms
- Xanthophryne tigerinus [orth. error] Biju, Van Bocxlaer, Giri, Loader, and Bossuyt, 2009; Xanthophryne tigerina (Biju, Van Bocxlaer, Giri, Loader, and Bossuyt, 2009)

= Beduka amboli =

Species of amphibian

Beduka amboli, sometimes known as the Amboli lateritic toad, is a species of toad in the family Bufonidae. It is endemic to the Western Ghats of India and known only from the vicinity of Amboli in Maharashtra. It was described as a new species in 2009 and placed in the now defunct genus Xanthophryne with its sister species Xanthophryne [Beduka] konyaensis.

== Taxonomy ==
When the species was moved to the Beduka genus, the species epithet was changed from tigrina to amboli to avoid confusion with another frog species in southern India, Hoplobatrachus tigerinus.

== Description ==
This species is medium-sized for a toad, males are smaller (male snout–vent length 28–33 mm (1.1–1.3 in), female 33–35 mm (1.3–1.4 in)), somewhat elongated with a broken canthal ridge. They are yellowish with dark stripes on top and sides of the body and lack webbing between the toes and fingers.

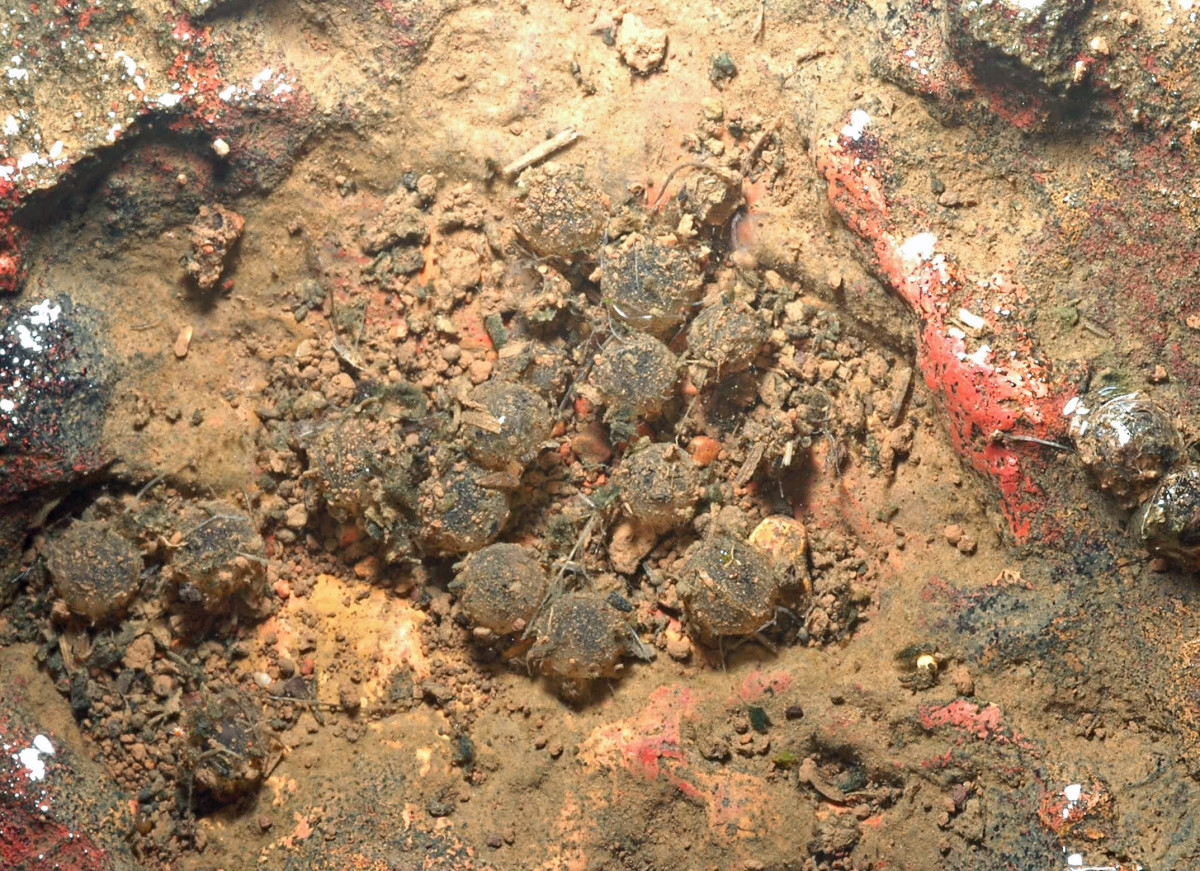
Egg clutch laid in a temporary puddle

== Reproduction ==
Breeding takes place in temporary ponds in cavities within lateritic rock. About 30–35 eggs are laid in a clutch.

== Habitat and conservation ==
This species inhabits high-altitude (>800m ASL) ferricrete plateaus and lateritic meadows. It is classified as Endangered by the IUCN because it occurs only at a single location and its habitat is fragmented by human development.
