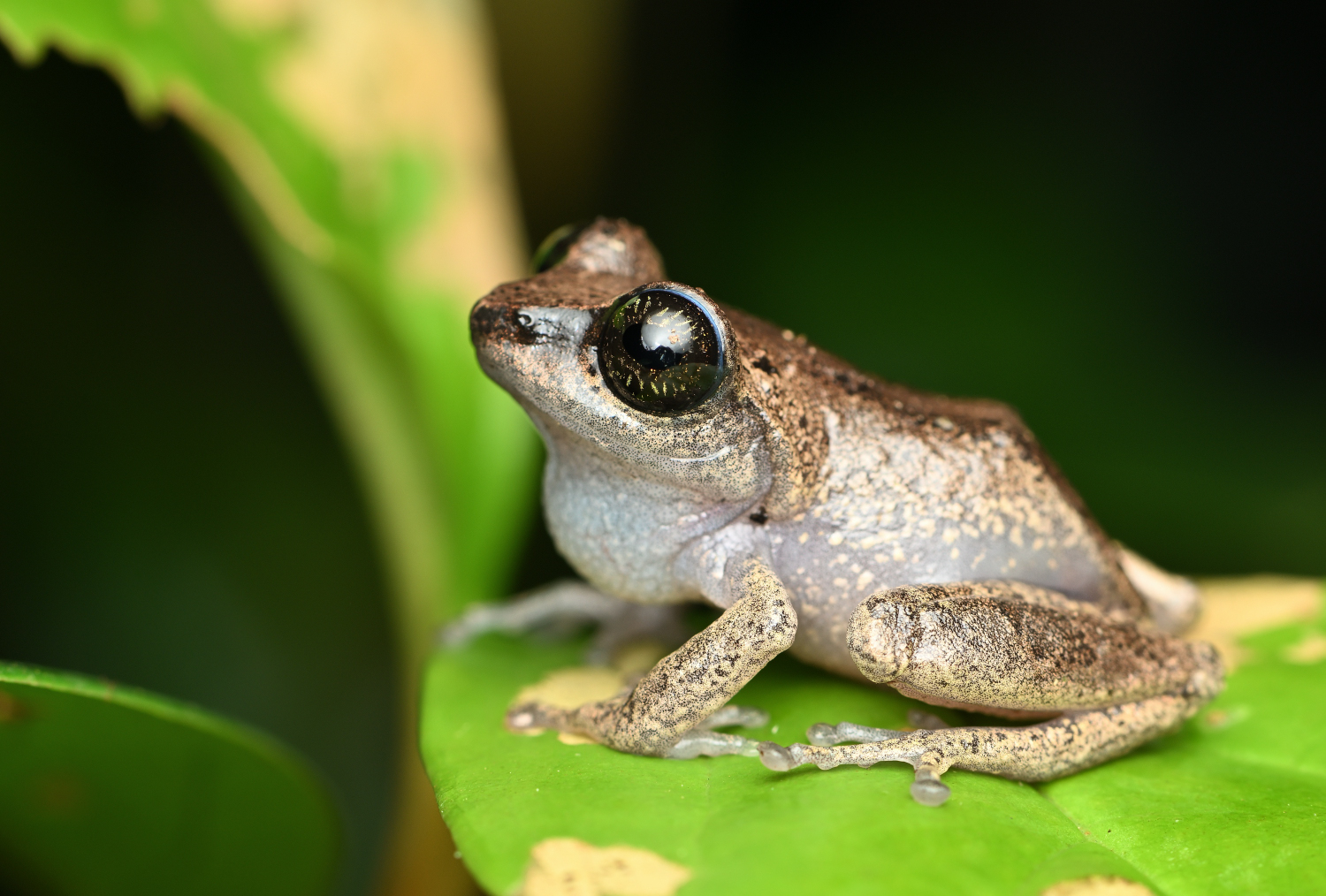

Conservation status
- Endangered (IUCN 3.1)

Scientific classification
- Kingdom: Animalia
- Phylum: Chordata
- Class: Amphibia
- Order: Anura
- Family: Rhacophoridae
- Genus: Raorchestes
- Species: R. chlorosomma

Binomial name
- Raorchestes chlorosomma (Biju & Bossuyt, 2009)

Synonyms
- Philautus chlorosomma Biju & Bossuyt; Pseudophilautus chlorosomma (Biju & Bossuyt)

= Raorchestes chlorosomma =

Green-eyed bushfrog

Species of amphibian

Raorchestes chlorosomma is a frog in the genus Raorchestes. The common name is the green-eyed bushfrog.

== Habitat ==
Green-eyed bushfrogs only occur in disturbed sholas, a type of high-altitude evergreen forests which are found only in the southern portion of the Western Ghats. This species has also been found near the secondary forest and tea and eucalyptus plantations after very heavy rains, from about 1 m (3 ft 3 in) above the ground, from thickets of Lantana or leaves of Eupatorium glandulosum. Like other congeners, this species breeds by direct development.

== Range ==
The green-eyed bushfrog is native to India and is known only from Munnar (1,410 m asl), Idukki district, state of Kerala, within the Western Ghats mountain range in India. In attempts to find how far the range of the bushfrog extends, surveys of neighboring areas have been undertaken, but the species was not found. So estimations of the extent of the range are less than 100 km^{2} (39 sq mi). 9November 2021" />

== Threats ==
The green-eyed bushfrog is a Critically Endangered species because both the habitat and area in which it is found are being degraded by the extensively used tea, eucalyptus, and wattle plantations. The area where they live is also experiencing large tourism industry developments which could be a potential threat to this species. Though it appears the species is adaptable, it is not understood what the tolerance threshold is if the habitat is disturbed.

== Conservation ==
There have been no current conservation actions to help protect this species.
