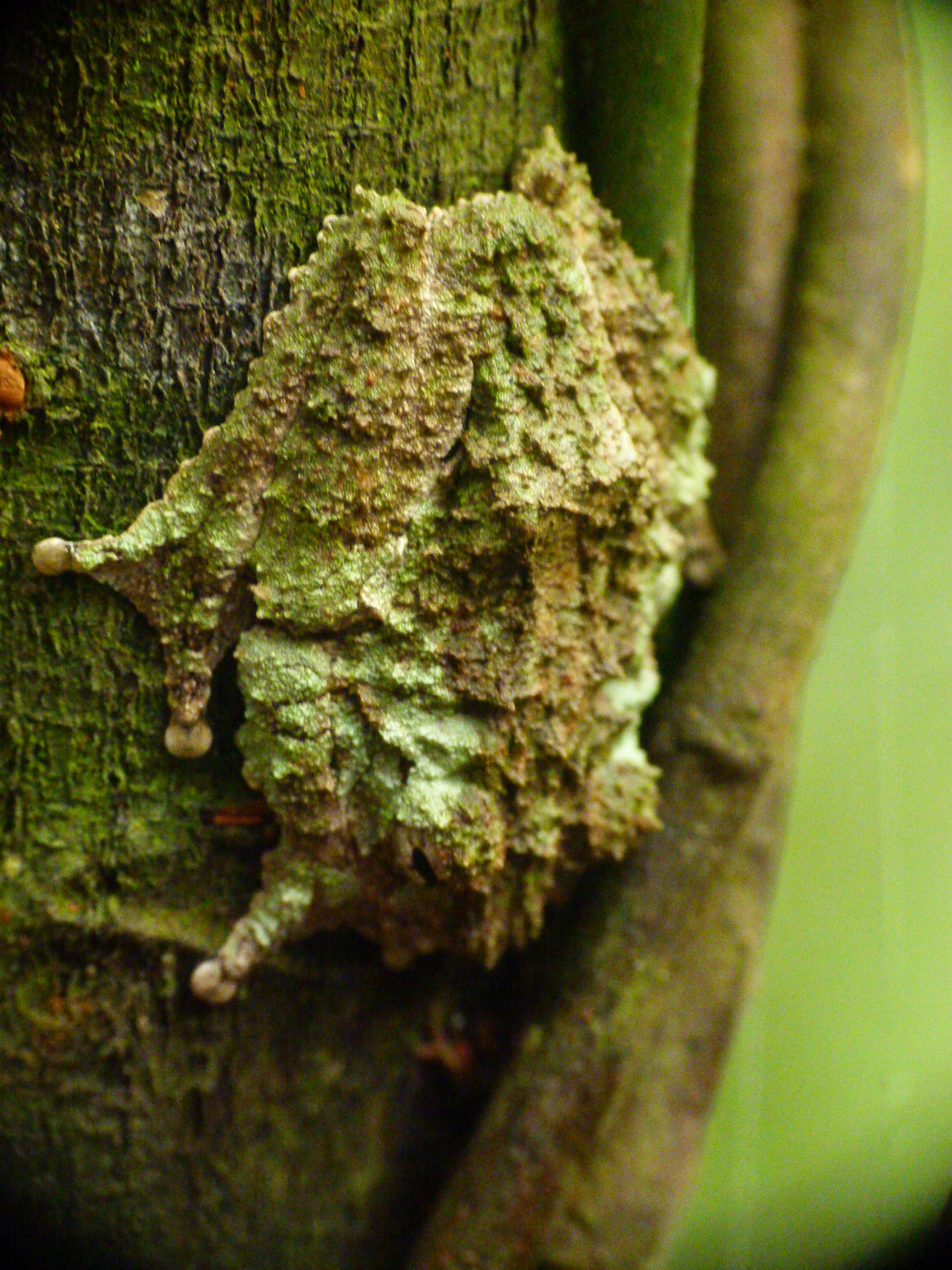

Conservation status
- Vulnerable (IUCN 3.1)

Scientific classification
- Kingdom: Animalia
- Phylum: Chordata
- Class: Amphibia
- Order: Anura
- Family: Rhacophoridae
- Genus: Raorchestes
- Species: R. nerostagona

Binomial name
- Raorchestes nerostagona (Biju & Bossuyt, 2005)

Synonyms
- Philautus nerostagona Biju & Bossuyt, 2005; Pseudophilautus nerostagona (Biju & Bossuyt, 2005)

= Raorchestes nerostagona =

Lichen bush frog

Species of amphibian

Raorchestes nerostagona is a species of frog in the family Rhacophoridae. It is endemic to the Western Ghats, India. It has been called as the Kalpetta yellow bush frog or lichen bush frog for its patchy lichen like patterning that make it cryptic. First described in 2005 based on a specimen obtained in Kalpetta, the species has subsequently been found in many parts of the Western Ghats. This frog has been observed between 900 and 1200 meters above sea level.

== Taxonomy ==
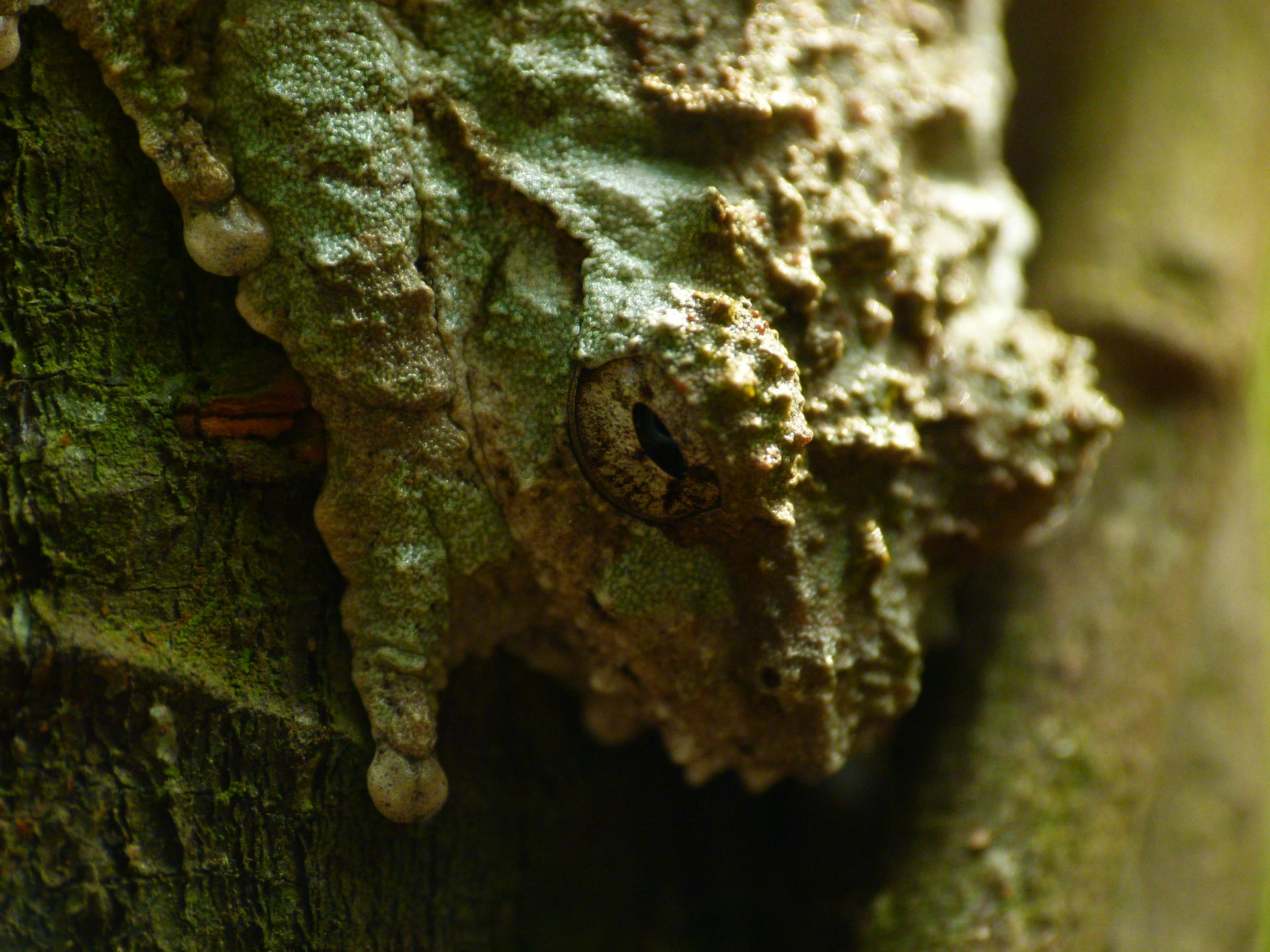
A view of the pattern and texture resembling lichen

The species was originally described in the genus Philautus but has since been moved into the genus Raorchestes. The species name is derived from Greek nero for water and stagona for drop and refers to the call of the frog which is emitted from high up in the trees and resembles the sound of a raindrop falling into water. Like all other members of this genus, eggs are thought to develop into little froglets entirely within the egg-shell, although this direct development pattern was not directly observed in the species at the time of its description.

== Description ==
Calls of the frog (along with that of Sri Lanka bay owl)

This species is distinguished from others in the genus by the presence of webbing between all the fingers and fully webbed toes as well. A fringe of skin is found along the outer edge of the fore and hind limbs. The tongue has a pointed papilla. The snout to vent length varies from about 3 to 3.5 cm and the colouration makes it cryptic among lichen and moss patches on tree trunks. The skin has projections making it appear rough.

The calls made from high in the tree canopy consist of a high-pitched "pluck" sounding like a rain-drop falling into a bucket of water repeating about every 3 to 4 seconds.

== Habitat and threats ==
The species was described as being widely distributed in the Wayanad region between Mananthavady, Sultan Battery, and Kalpetta where its call could be heard easily during the rainy season. It has been found in evergreen forests, high in the canopy. The female frog lays 40 eggs at a time in holes in trees.

This frog is classified as vulnerable to extinction because the habitat within its range is subject to degradation. Human being cut down forests to build or expand roads, for logging, for the illegal harvesting of certain trees, and for agriculture and grazing space. Climate change might also kill this frog.

Scientists have observed the fungus Batrachochytrium dendrobatidis on other frogs in Raorchestes, so it could infect R. munnarensis as well. Batrachochytrium dendrobatidis causes the fungal disease chytridiomycosis.

People call this the "water droplet call canopy bush frog" because its voice sounds like water droplets.
