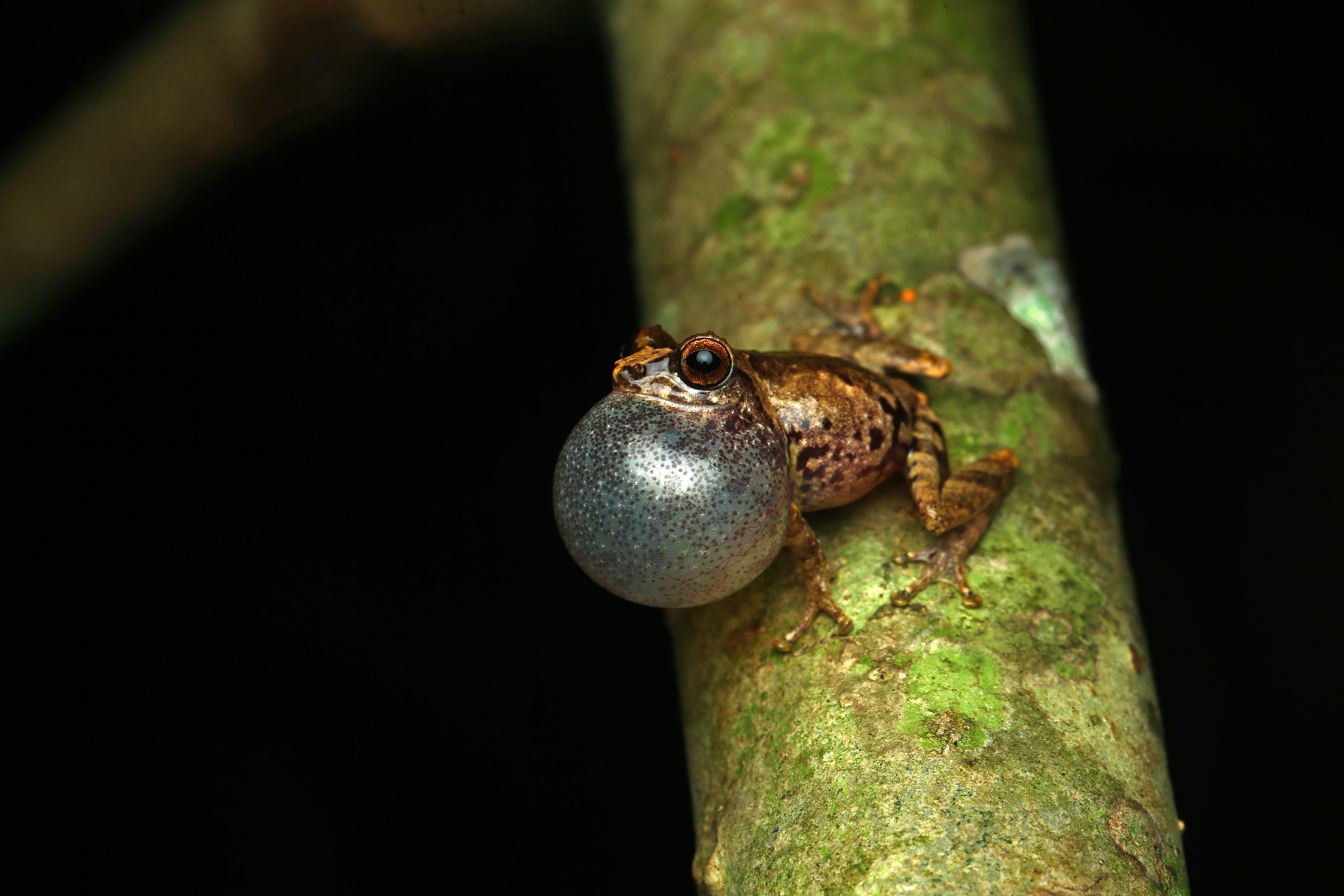
- Raorchestes anili

Conservation status
- Least Concern (IUCN 3.1)

Scientific classification
- Kingdom: Animalia
- Phylum: Chordata
- Class: Amphibia
- Order: Anura
- Family: Rhacophoridae
- Genus: Raorchestes
- Species: R. anili

Binomial name
- Raorchestes anili (Biju & Bossuyt, 2006)

Synonyms
- Philautus anili Biju and Bossuyt, 2006; Pseudophilautus anili (Biju and Bossuyt, 2006)

= Raorchestes anili =

Species of frog

Raorchestes anili, known commonly as Anil's bush frog, is a species of frog in the family Rhacophoridae.

It is found in the Western Ghats in the state of Kerala in India. It has been observed between 840 and 1,150 m (2,760 and 3,770 ft) above sea level. Its habitats include roadside vegetation and gardens.

The adult male frog measures 23.2–25.2 mm (0.91–0.99 in) from nose to rear end and one female specimen measured 29.3 mm (1.15 in). The skin of the dorsum is light brown in color with darker brown marks. There is a dark brown mark on each side of the body, stretching from each front leg to each hind leg, meeting in the middle to make a V shape. There is a light brown intraorbital mark. Most of the snout is gray. There are many brown-black spots on the back. The iris of the eye is yellow-red in color with a gray rim.

Scientists named this frog after Anil Zachariah, who assisted Dr. Biju.

People have seen this frog in forests, coffee farms, roadside vegetation, and near human habitation. This frog breeds through direct development with no free-swimming tadpole stage.

Scientists believe this frog is not in danger of dying out because of its large range and tolerance to human-altered habitats.

Calling frog during the rains, Wynaad, India
