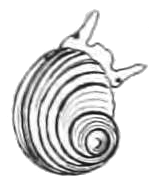
- A drawing of Cremnoconchus syhadrensis

Scientific classification
- Kingdom: Animalia
- Phylum: Mollusca
- Class: Gastropoda
- Subclass: Caenogastropoda
- Order: Littorinimorpha
- Family: Littorinidae
- Subfamily: Lacuninae
- Genus: Cremnoconchus; Blanford, 1869

Diversity
- 9 freshwater species

Synonyms
- Cremnobates Blanford, 1863; Cremnobates Swainson, 1855 (invalid homonym); Cremnobates Gunther, 1861 (invalid homonym); Lissoconchus Thiele, 1929

= Cremnoconchus =

Genus of gastropods

Cremnoconchus is a genus of small freshwater snails, gastropod mollusks in the otherwise marine family Littorinidae, the winkles or periwinkles.

The generic name Cremnoconchus is from the Greek word κρημνός which means precipice and from the Ancient Greek word κόγχος which means shell.

This is the only freshwater genus within the Littorinidae; all other genera belonging to the family are marine. Molecular dating based on fossil records showed that Cremnoconchus separated from their last marine ancestor around 90 million years ago and have since diversified within the Indian sub-continent. Based on this time of split, it has been postulated that either break-up of Gondwana or fluctuating sea levels might have facilitated their diversification. Based on the current distribution of the closest relatives of Cremnoconchus, a Gondwanan origin is highly likely.

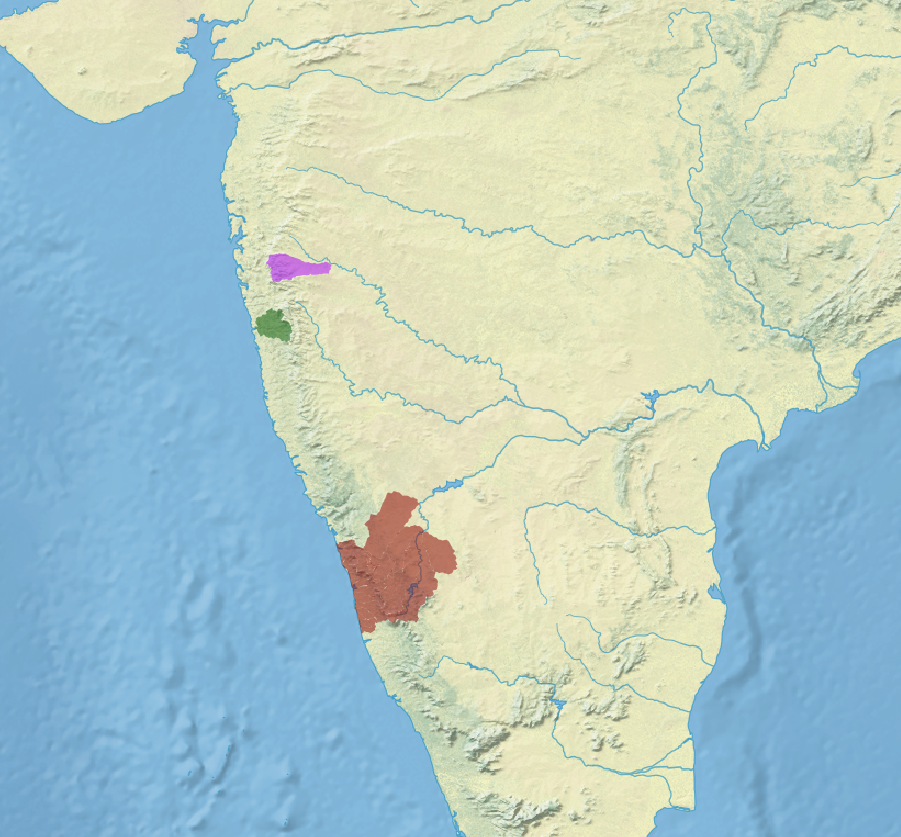
Distribution map of three Cremnoconchus species: violet - Cremnoconchus conicus; green - Cremnoconchus carinatus; dark red - Cremnoconchus syhadrensis.

The genus Cremnoconchus is endemic to the Western Ghats of India. All Cremnoconchus species live in spray zones of waterfalls i.e., not directly under the heavy flow of the water. Most species are restricted to one waterfall, earning them the title of point endemic. Very high footfall of tourists in the waterfalls of the Western ghats, accumulated waste, upstream pollution are all concerns for their habitat disturbance and degradation. These factors along with their extremely limited distribution make them highly vulnerable to extinction.

== Species ==
There were recognized 2-3 species by Strong et al. in 2008, but Reid et al. described 6 new species of Cremnoconchus in 2013.

Species within the genus Cremnoconchus include:

- Cremnoconchus agumbensis Reid, Aravind & Madhyastha, 2013
- Cremnoconchus canaliculatus W. T. Blanford, 1870 - synonym: Cremnoconchus fairbanki Hanley & Theobald, 1876
- Cremnoconchus castanea Reid, Aravind & Madhyastha, 2013
- Cremnoconchus cingulatus Reid, Aravind & Madhyastha, 2013
- Cremnoconchus conicus Blanford, 1870 - synonym: Cremnoconchus carinatus (Layard, 1854)
- Cremnoconchus dwarakii Reid, Aravind & Madhyastha, 2013
- Cremnoconchus globulus Reid, Aravind & Madhyastha, 2013
- Cremnoconchus hanumani Reid, Aravind & Madhyastha, 2013
- Cremnoconchus syhadrensis (Blanford, 1863) - type species

Synonyms

- Cremnochonchus messageri Bavay & Dautzenberg, 1900 is a synonym for Paludomus messageri (Bavay & Dautzenberg, 1900)
