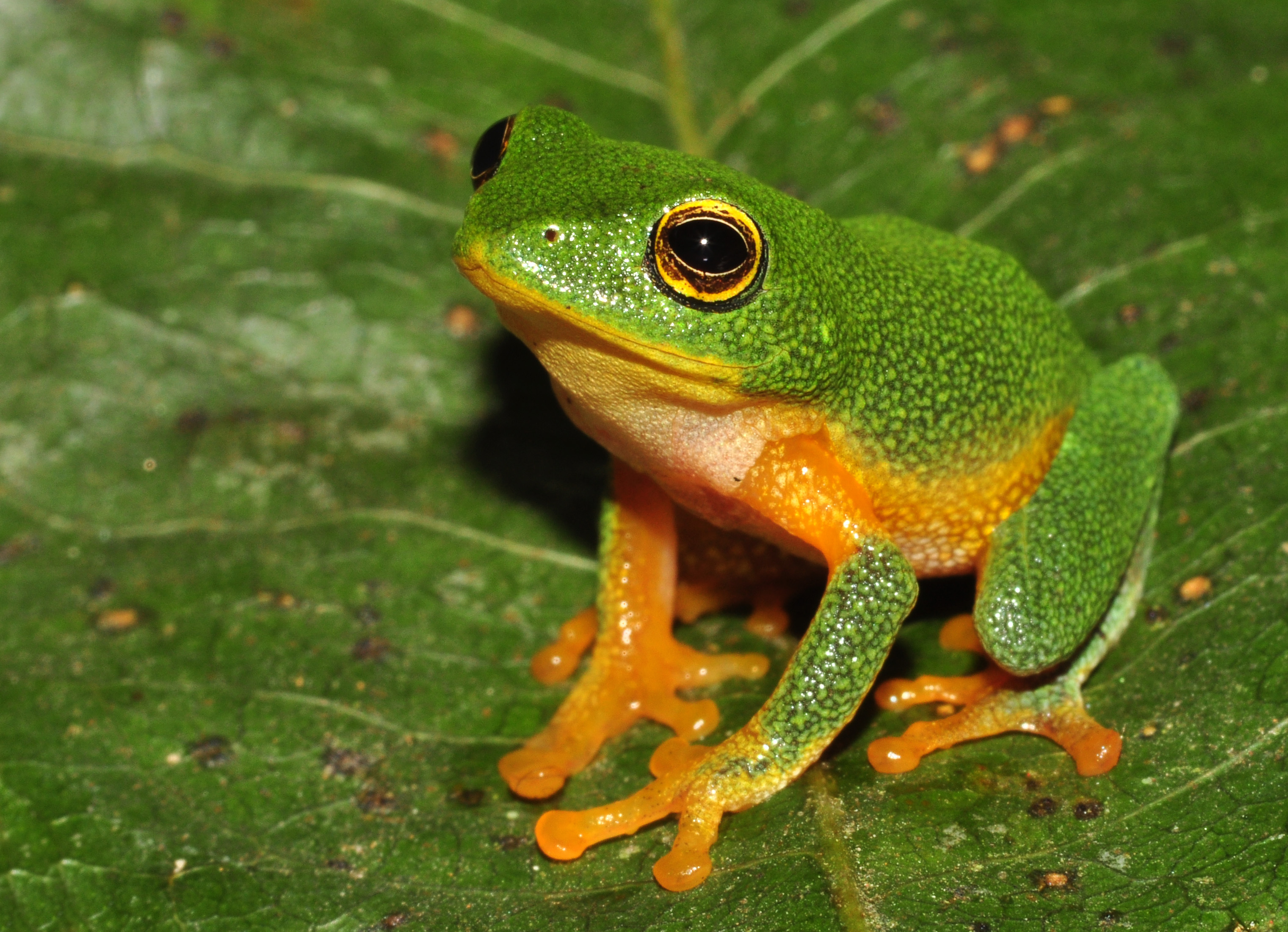

Conservation status
- Near Threatened (IUCN 3.1)

Scientific classification
- Kingdom: Animalia
- Phylum: Chordata
- Class: Amphibia
- Order: Anura
- Family: Rhacophoridae
- Genus: Raorchestes
- Species: R. bobingeri

Binomial name
- Raorchestes bobingeri (Biju & Bossuyt, 2005)
- Range of Raorchestes bobingeri

Synonyms
- Philautus bobingeri Biju & Bossuyt, 2005

= Raorchestes bobingeri =

Species of frog

Raorchestes bobingeri, commonly known as Bob Inger's bush frog, is a species of frog in the family Rhacophoridae. The species is native to India.

== Etymology ==
The specific name, bobingeri, is in honor of American herpetologist Robert Frederick "Bob" Inger.

== Geographic range ==
R. bobingeri is endemic to the Western Ghats of India. It has been observed between 1,030 and 1,300 meters (3,380 and 4,270 ft) above sea level.

== Habitat ==
R. bobingeri lives in trees in primary and secondary forests. It has been observed at former logging sites but does not otherwise tolerate habitat disturbance.

== Conservation status ==
Scientists classify R. bobingeri as "Near Threatened" because of its relatively large, nonfragmented range. The frog lives in three protected parks: Kalakad Mundanthurai Tiger Reserve, Ponmudi Reserve Forest, and Peppara Wildlife Sanctuary.

== Original description ==
- Biju, S.D.; Bossuyt, F. (2005). "Two New Philautus (Anura: Ranidae: Rhacophorinae) from Ponmudi Hill in the Western Ghats of India". Copeia. 2005 (1): 29–37. doi:10.1643/CH-04-194R1. S2CID 62792108. (Philautus bobingeri, new species).
