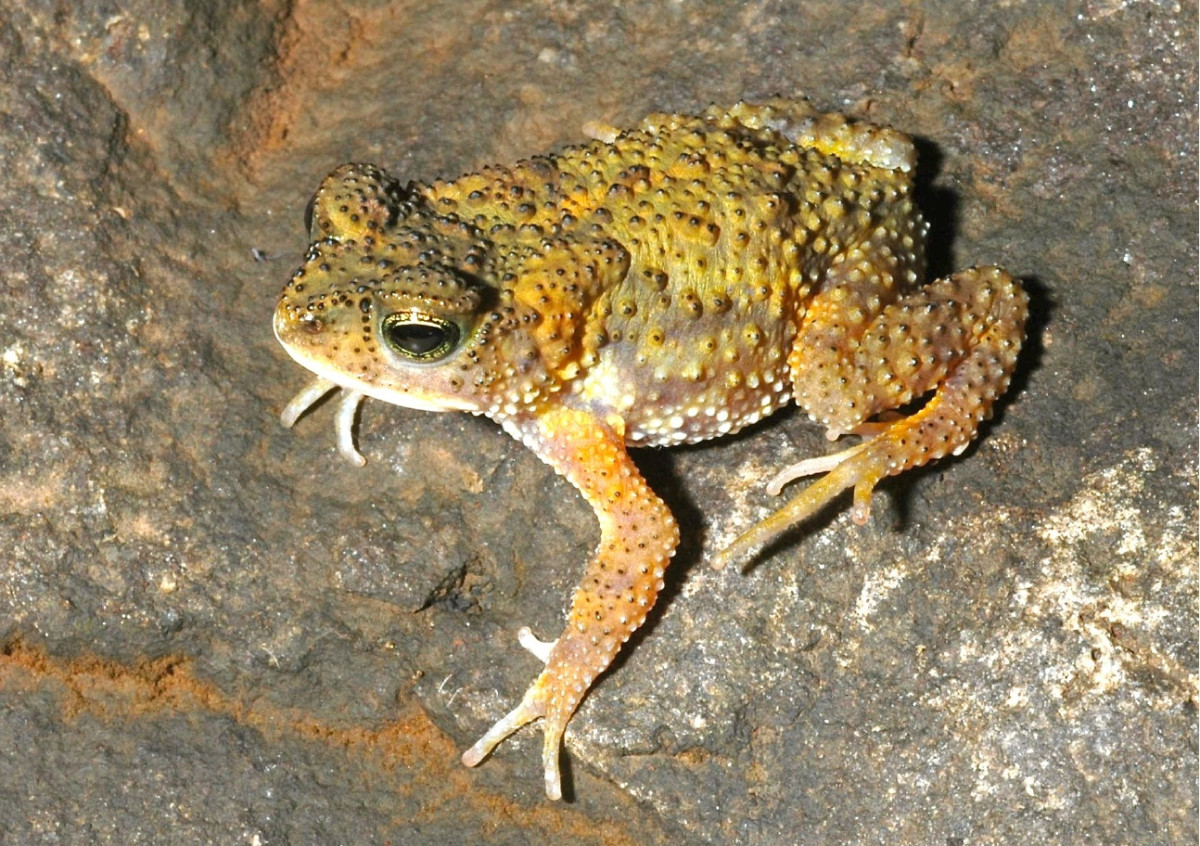
- Adult male

Conservation status
- Endangered (IUCN 3.1)

Scientific classification
- Kingdom: Animalia
- Phylum: Chordata
- Class: Amphibia
- Order: Anura
- Family: Bufonidae
- Genus: Beduka
- Species: B. koynayensis

Binomial name
- Beduka koynayensis (Soman, 1963)

Synonyms
- Bufo koynayensis Soman, 1963; Bufo sulphureus Grandison and Daniel, 1964; "Bufo" koynayensis Frost et al., 2006; Xanthophryne koynayensis Biju, Van Bocxlaer, Giri, Loader, and Bossuyt, 2009

= Beduka koynayensis =

Species of amphibian

Beduka koynayensis (common names: Humbali Village toad, chrome-yellow toad, Koyna toad) is a species of toad in the family Bufonidae. It is endemic to the Western Ghats of India where it is known from Koyna (including Koyna Wildlife Sanctuary) in the Maharashtra state. Formerly included in the genus Bufo and Xanthophryne, it is currently the type species of genus Beduka.

== History ==
Beduka koynayensis has been described twice using the same materials collected in connection with the Koyna Hydroelectric Project: first as Bufo koynayensis by Soman in 1963, and then as Bufo sulphureus by Grandison and Daniel in 1964.

== Description ==
Beduka koynayensis are relatively small toads: adult males measure 24–32 mm (0.94–1.26 in) in snout–vent length. The body is covered by small warts with black tips and dark brown in colour; there are yellow patches on the flanks, thighs, and shoulders. The tympanum is indistinct.

== Habitat and conservation ==
Beduka koynayensis is a rare species. Its natural habitats are moist to wet evergreen forest and dry riparian grassland. It is threatened by habitat loss caused by agriculture and clear cutting of forests.
