= Cremnoconchus conicus =

Conservation status
- Vulnerable (IUCN 3.1)

Scientific classification
- Kingdom: Animalia
- Phylum: Mollusca
- Class: Gastropoda
- Subclass: Caenogastropoda
- Order: Littorinimorpha
- Family: Littorinidae
- Genus: Cremnoconchus
- Species: C. conicus

Binomial name
- Cremnoconchus conicus Blanford, 1870
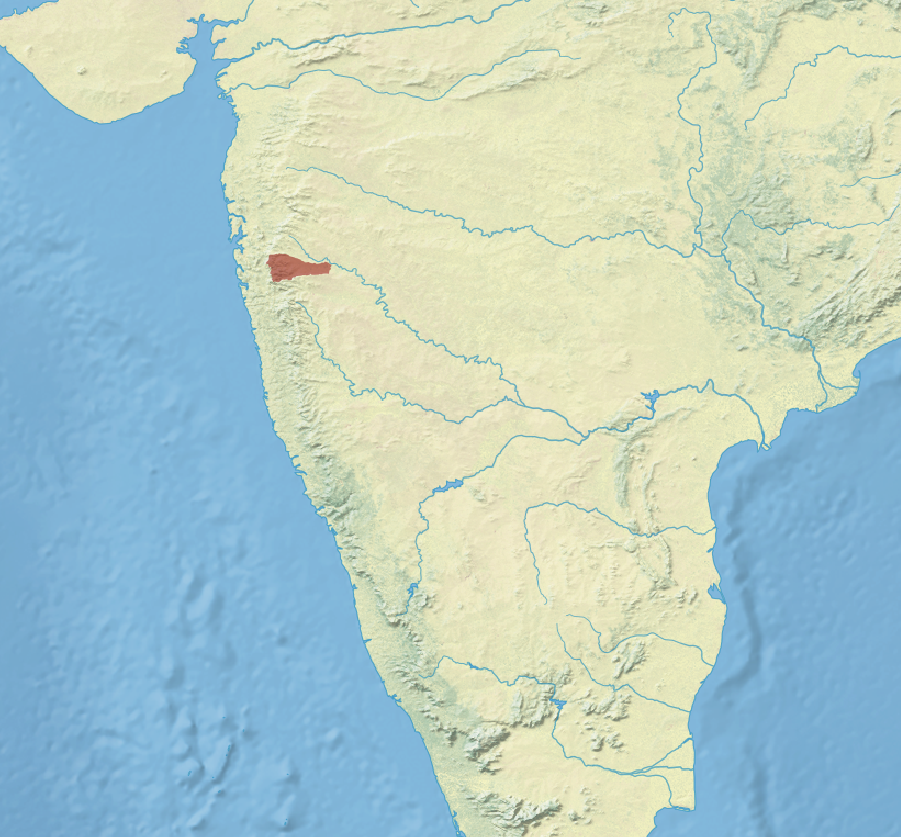
- Distribution map of Cremnoconchus conicus

Synonyms
- Anculotus carinatus Layard, 1855; Cremnoconchus carinatus (Layard, 1855); Cremnoconchus carinatus var. gigantea Nevill, 1885; Cremnoconchus conicus var. edecollata Nevill, 1885; Cremnoconchus conicus var. gigantea Nevill, 1885

Species of gastropod

Cremnoconchus conicus is a species of freshwater snail, an aquatic gastropod mollusk in the family Littorinidae, the winkles or periwinkles.

== Distribution ==
This species is endemic to the Western Ghats range, in India.
