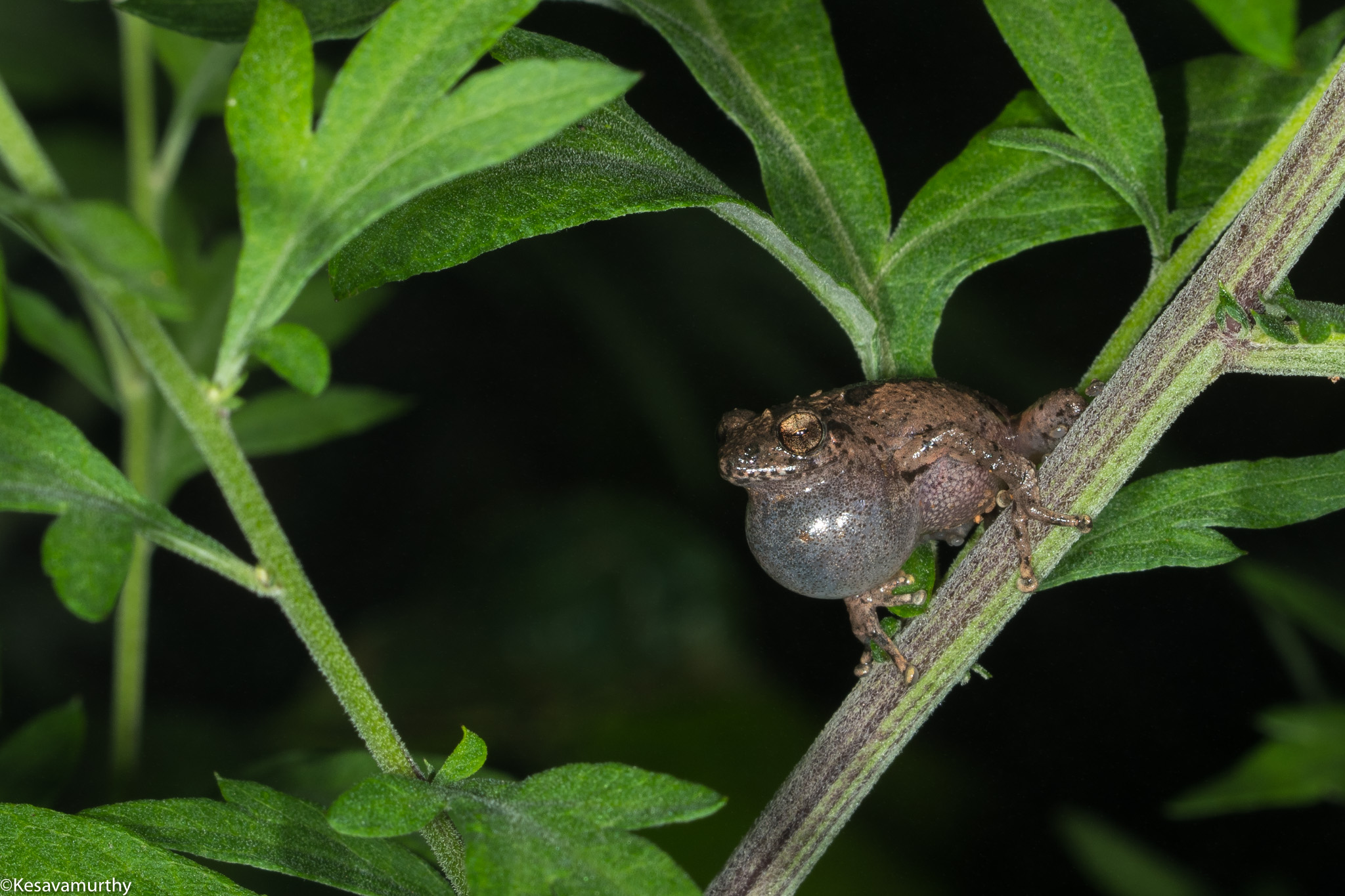

Conservation status
- Vulnerable (IUCN 3.1)

Scientific classification
- Kingdom: Animalia
- Phylum: Chordata
- Class: Amphibia
- Order: Anura
- Family: Rhacophoridae
- Genus: Raorchestes
- Species: R. griet

Binomial name
- Raorchestes griet Bossuyt, 2002
- Distribution of Raorchestes griet

Synonyms
- Philautus griet Bossuyt, 2002; Pseudophilautus griet

= Raorchestes griet =

Species of frog

Raorchestes griet is a species of frog in the family Rhacophoridae. It is endemic to the Western Ghats south of the Palghat Gap in Kerala and Tamil Nadu states, India. The specific name griet honours Griet Decock, spouse of Franky Bossuyt, the scientist who described the species. The common name Griet bush frog has been coined for it.

== Description ==
Adult males measure 20–22 mm (0.8–0.9 in) and adult females, based on a single specimen, 22 mm (0.9 in) in snout–vent length. The snout is rounded. The tympanum is indistinct, but the supratympanic fold is prominent. The fingers have well-developed discs and dermal fringes but no webbing. The toes have discs and rudimentary webbing. Skin of snout bears small horny spines, and there are horny ridges between eyes, arranged in triangle. Dorsal skin is covered with small horny spines. The dorsum is light greyish brown, light brownish grey, or light-reddish brown. Dark or light red markings may be present.

== Habitat and conservation ==
Raorchestes griet has been observed in roadside vegetation near isolated forest patches or in plantations near forests at about 600–2,000 m (2,000–6,600 ft) above sea level. It is nocturnal and arboreal, which leaves it endangered by logging. Males call from ground level up to two metres above the ground. It has been observed on eucalyptus trees, but scientists do not think the frogs can live on commercial eucalyptus plantings as other frogs can.

This species can be locally abundant, but it is threatened by habitat fragmentation associated with deforestation. Visitors may also disturb this frog during annual pilgrimages to the Western Ghats. Scientists have observed that the fungus Batrachochytrium dendrobatidis can infect other frogs in Raorchestes, so they infer the fungal disease chytridiomycosis may also infect R. griet. Scientists also name climate change as a threat to this frog.

The frog's range includes several protected parks.Meghamalai Wildlife Sanctuary, Eravikulam National Park, Kodaikanal Wildlife Sanctuary, Anamalai Tiger Reserve and Periyar Tiger Reserve.
