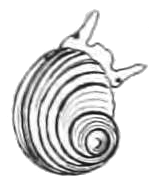
- A drawing of a dorsal view of a live Cremnoconchus syhadrensis

Conservation status
- Endangered (IUCN 3.1)

Scientific classification
- Kingdom: Animalia
- Phylum: Mollusca
- Class: Gastropoda
- Subclass: Caenogastropoda
- Order: Littorinimorpha
- Family: Littorinidae
- Genus: Cremnoconchus
- Species: C. syhadrensis

Binomial name
- Cremnoconchus syhadrensis (Blanford, 1863)
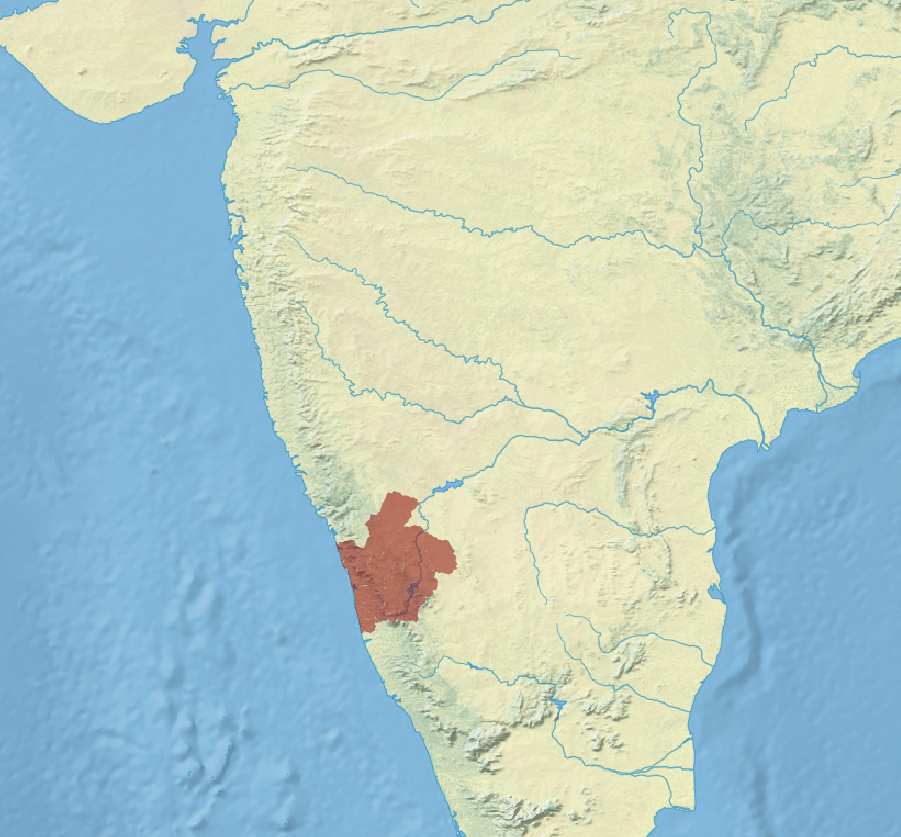
- Distribution map of Cremnoconchus syhadrensis

Synonyms
- Cremnobates syhadrensis Blanford, 1863

= Cremnoconchus syhadrensis =

Species of gastropod

Cremnoconchus syhadrensis is a species of freshwater snail, an aquatic gastropod mollusk in the family Littorinidae, the winkles or periwinkles.

Cremnoconchus syhadrensis is the type species of the genus Cremnoconchus.

== Distribution ==
This species occurs in Western Ghats, India.

== Description ==
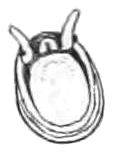
Drawing of a live Cremnoconchus syhadrensis seen from below

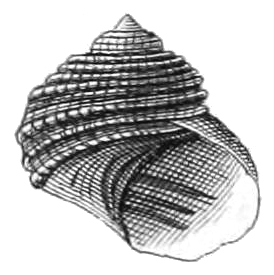
Drawing of an apertural view of the shell

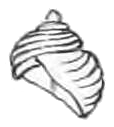
Drawing of a lateral view of the shell

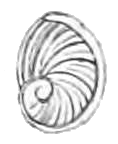
Drawing of the outer side of the operculum

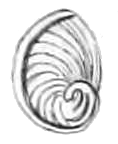
Drawing of the inner side of the operculum
