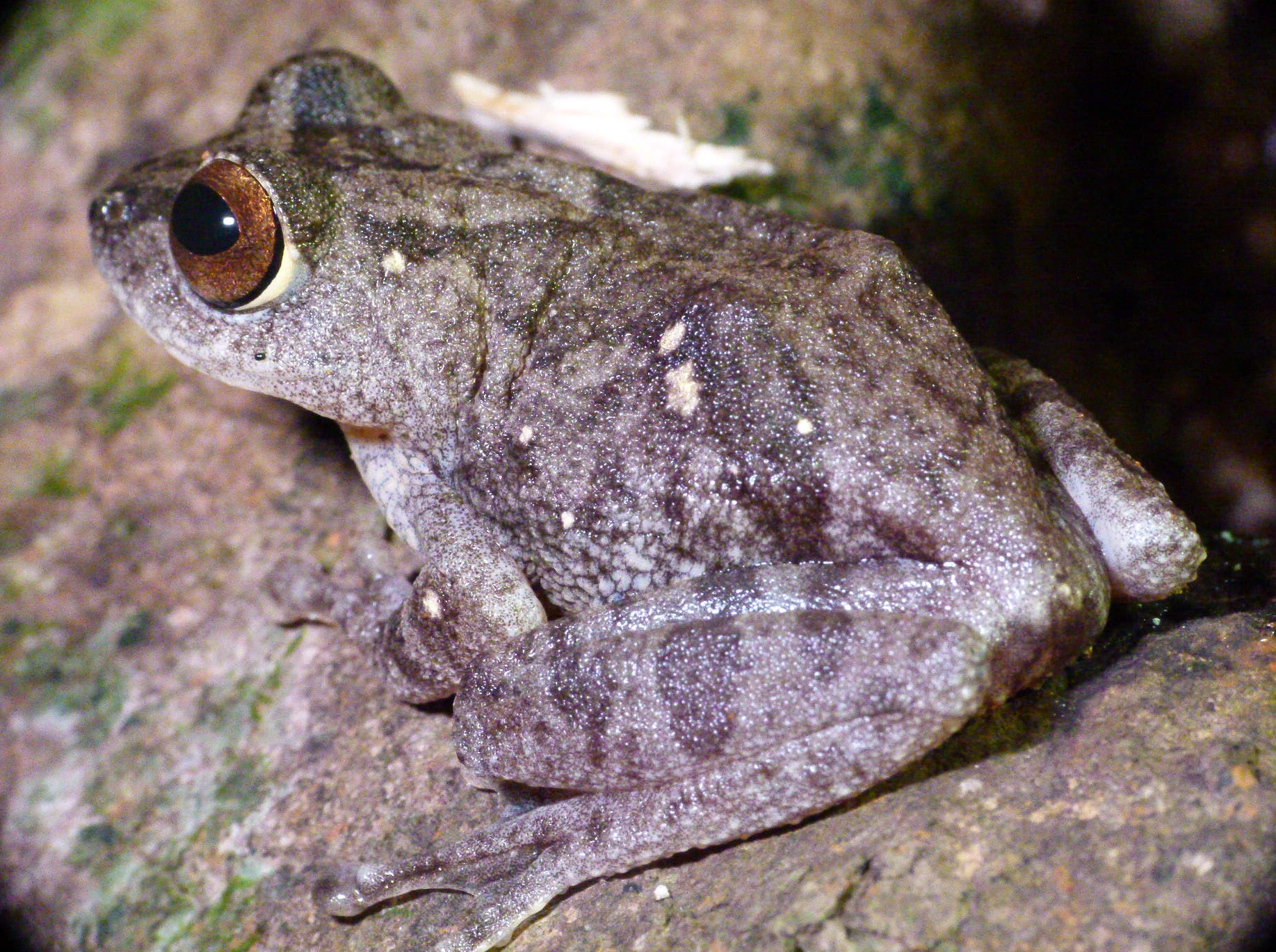

Conservation status
- Least Concern (IUCN 3.1)

Scientific classification
- Kingdom: Animalia
- Phylum: Chordata
- Class: Amphibia
- Order: Anura
- Family: Rhacophoridae
- Genus: Raorchestes
- Species: R. ponmudi

Binomial name
- Raorchestes ponmudi (Biju & Bossuyt, 2005)

Synonyms
- Philautus ponmudi Biju & Bossuyt, 2005

= Raorchestes ponmudi =

Species of frog

Raorchestes ponmudi is a species of frog in the family Rhacophoridae. It is endemic to the Western Ghats, India.

== Appearance ==
It is a large species within the genus, with males measuring nearly 4 cm long from the tip of the snout to the vent. Unusually for frogs, the male is larger than the female. These frogs are larger than any other frog or toad in their habitat.

Each frog has two stripes reaching from the eye to the vent. The stripes cross each other, forming an X on the back. There is a light brown intraorbital mark. The skin of the ventrum is gray-yellow in color with some white and black. The hind legs are light brown with gray marks. The iris of the eye is gold-bronw in color with a gray circle. There is some green color on the front legs.

Like other frogs in the genus, it undergoes direct development. The tadpoles develop into tiny frogs within the egg, with no free-swimming tadpole stage.

== Habitat ==
Its natural habitat is subtropical or tropical moist montane forests, which are threatened habitats. It was first described from Ponmudi hill, for which it is named, but the species was later found to have a wider distribution within the southern Western Ghats. It has been found about 1000 meters above sea level. It has been recorded in Wynaad, Idukki, and Thiruvananthapuram districts in Kerala, and Valparai in Tamil Nadu. It has been observed perched on branches 8–15 meters off the ground, high in the forest canopy.

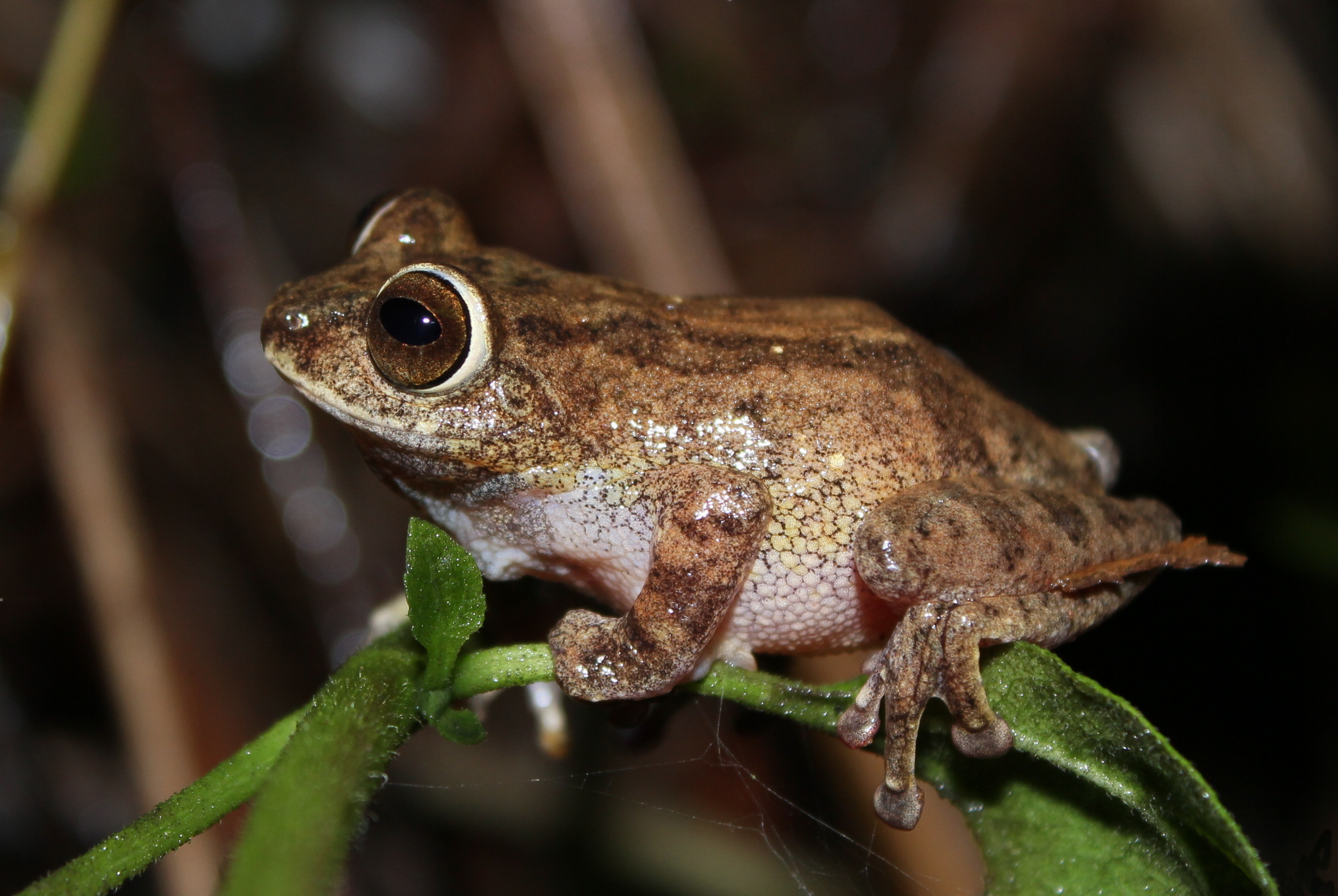
Lateral view

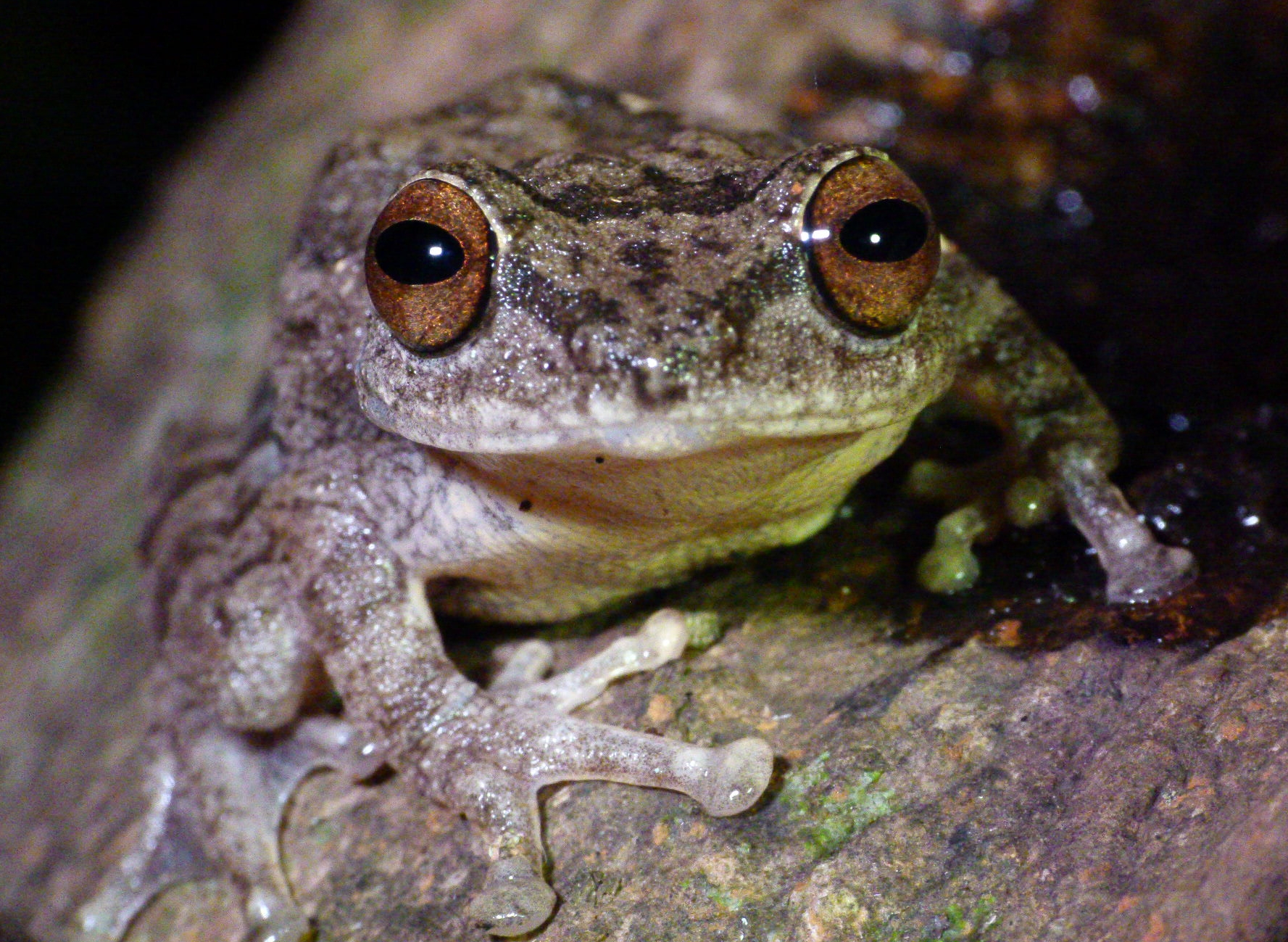
Front view

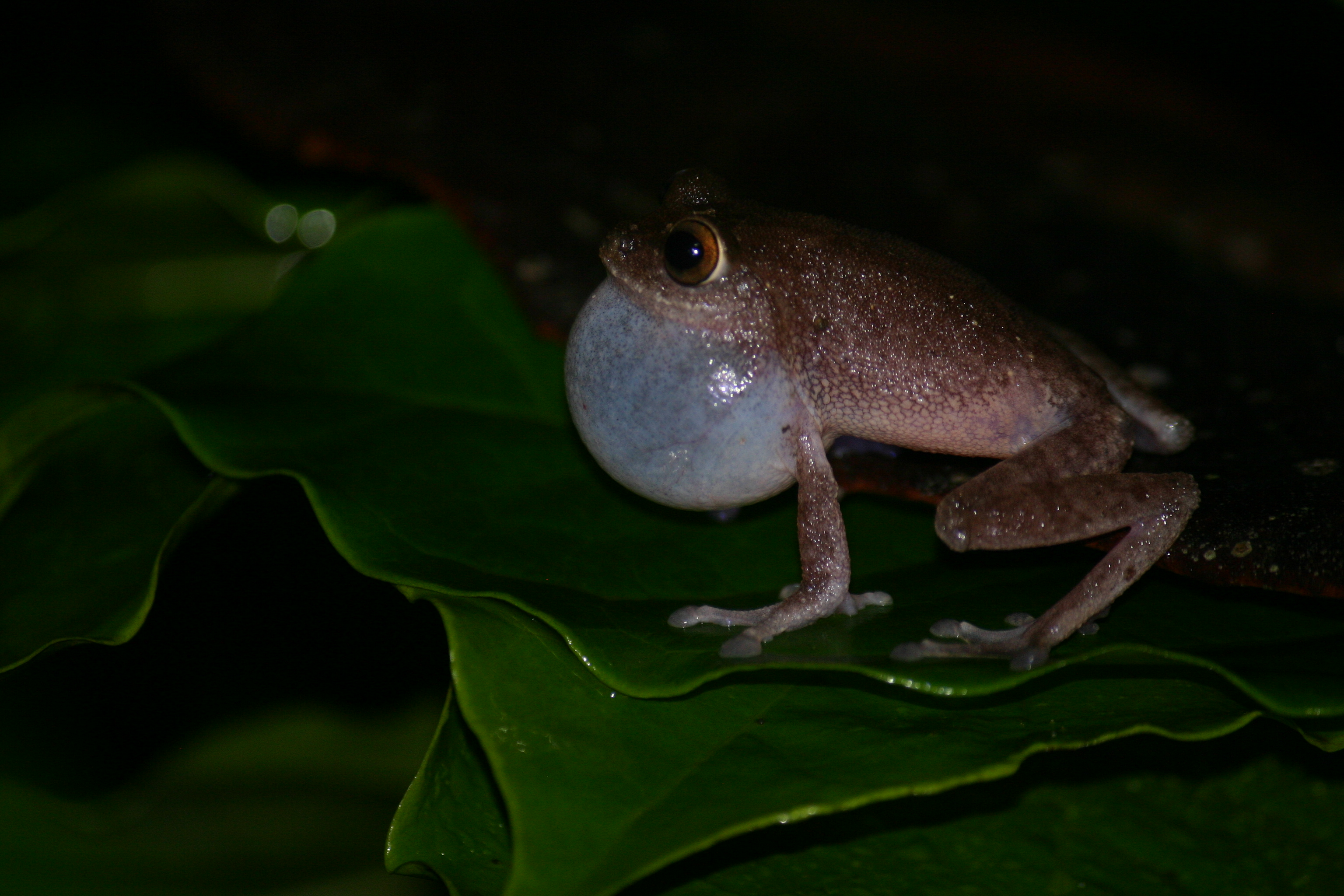
Calling
