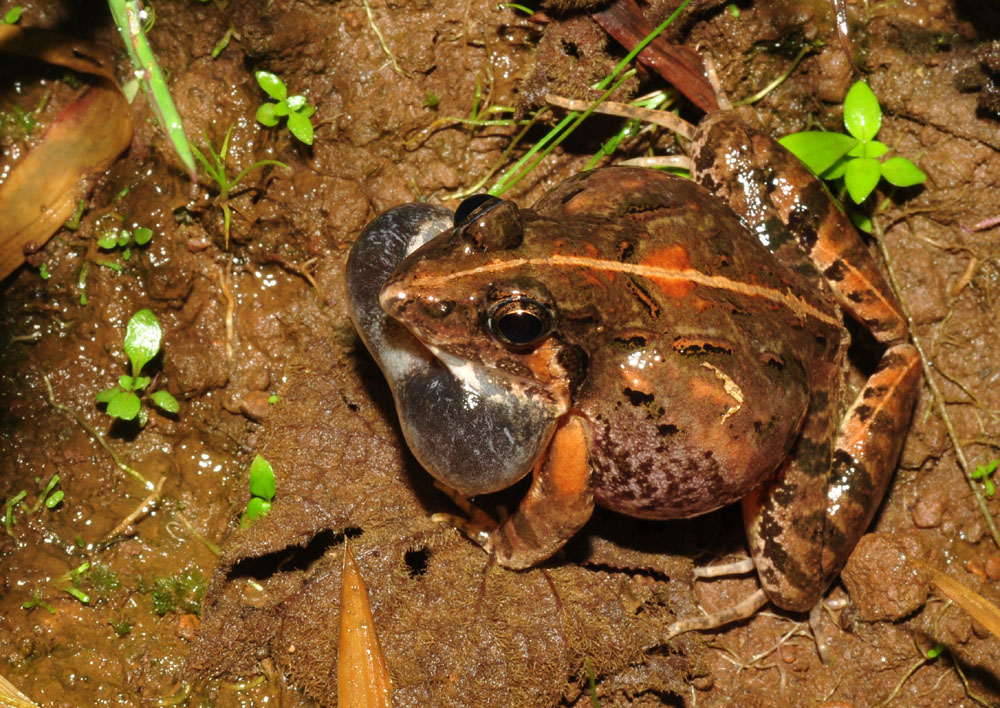
- Male vocalizing

Conservation status
- Least Concern (IUCN 3.1)

Scientific classification
- Kingdom: Animalia
- Phylum: Chordata
- Class: Amphibia
- Order: Anura
- Family: Dicroglossidae
- Genus: Minervarya
- Species: M. nilagirica

Binomial name
- Minervarya nilagirica (Jerdon, 1853)

Synonyms
- List: Fejervarya mudduraja Kuramoto, Joshy, Kurabayashi, and Sumida, 2008 "2007"; Fejervarya murthii (Pillai, 1979); Fejervarya nilagiricus (Jerdon, 1853); Minervarya mudduraja (Kuramoto, Joshy, Kurabayashi, and Sumida, 2008); Minervarya murthii (Pillai, 1979); Rana limnocharis nilagirica Annandale, 1917; Rana murthii Pillai, 1979; Rana nilagirica Jerdon, 1853; Zakerana mudduraja (Kuramoto, Joshy, Kurabayashi, and Sumida, 2008); Zakerana murthii (Pillai, 1979); Zakerana nilagirica (Jerdon, 1853)

= Minervarya nilagirica =

Nilgiris wart frog

Species of amphibian

Minervarya nilagirica, commonly known as Nilgiris wart frog, or Nilgiri frog, is a species of frog that is endemic to India.

== Description ==
Minervarya nilagirica has a relatively large size compared to the other species in its genus.

== Habitat and distribution ==
It is found along roadsides and around wetlands excepting wet paddy fields. It is found from Karnataka to Tamil Nadu, and Kerala, in the Western and Eastern Ghats of India, at 800-1600 m elevation.
