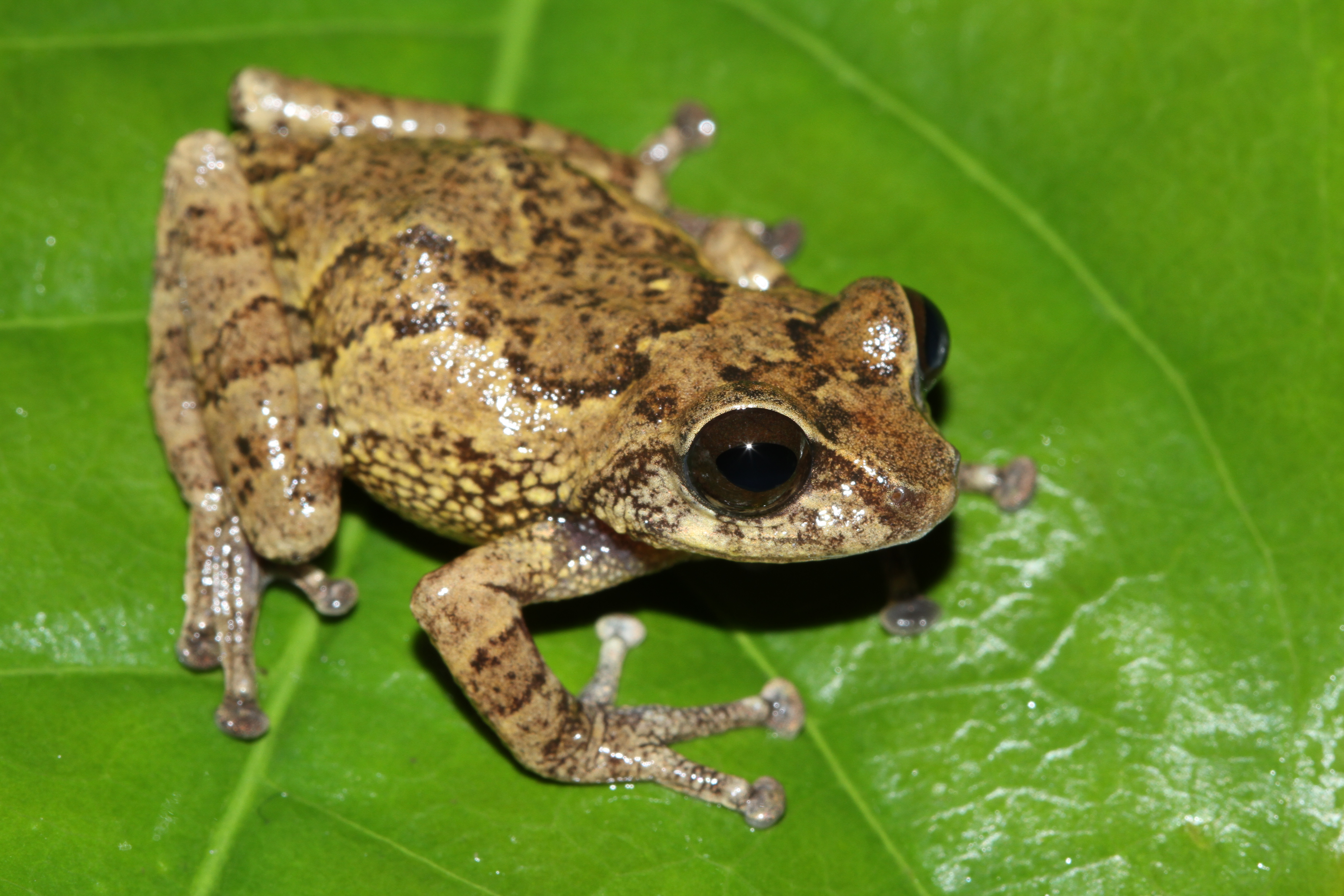

Conservation status
- Endangered (IUCN 3.1)

Scientific classification
- Kingdom: Animalia
- Phylum: Chordata
- Class: Amphibia
- Order: Anura
- Family: Rhacophoridae
- Genus: Raorchestes
- Species: R. munnarensis

Binomial name
- Raorchestes munnarensis (Biju and Bossuyt, 2009)

Synonyms
- Philautus munnarensis Biju and Bossuyt, 2009; Pseudophilautus munnarensis (Biju and Bossuyt, 2009)

= Raorchestes munnarensis =

Munnar bush frog

Species of frog

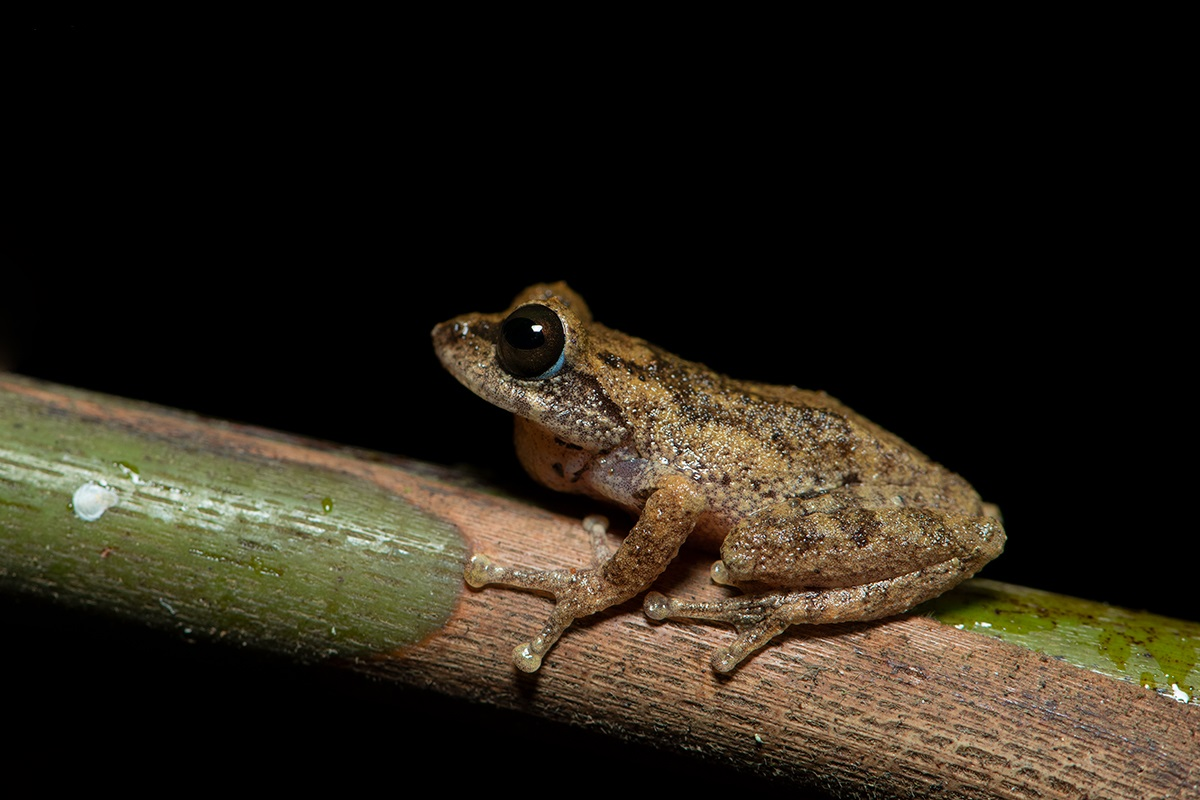
Munnar Bush frog

Raorchestes munnarensis (Munnar bush frog) is a species of frog in the family Rhacophoridae endemic to Munnar, Kerala, along the Ghat road to Devikulam in the southern Western Ghats, India.

== Habitat ==
It is known only from a small area (less than 20 km^{2}) of secondary vegetation, adjoining the forest along the Ghat road. Specimens were found close to a tea plantation, but not inside the plantation. It breeds by direct development. Its natural habitat is heavily degraded former forest.

The frog's range includes two protected parks: Eravikulam National Park and Anamalai Tiger Reserve. Scientists estimate about 50% of the living population lives in these two parks.

== Threats ==
The species is threatened by anthropogenic habitat loss. including habitat clearance for tea and eucalyptus plantations, all the more concerning since there are no other areas of suitable habitat known in the surrounding region.

Scientists also cite climate change and the fungal disease chytridiomycosis as threats to this frog. The fungus Batrachochytrium dendrobatidis has been observed on other frogs in Raorchestes, so scientists infer that R. munnarensis mat be susceptible as well.

== Conservation actions ==
The range of the species is not within any protected area, and protection of the remaining habitat at the species' only known locality is an urgent priority.

== Original description ==
- Biju SD; Bossuyt F (2009). "Systematics and phylogeny of Philautus Gistel, 1848 (Anura, Rhacophoridae) in the Western Ghats of India, with descriptions of 12 new species". Zool J Linn Soc (Abstract). 155 (2): 374–444. doi:10.1111/j.1096-3642.2008.00466.x.
