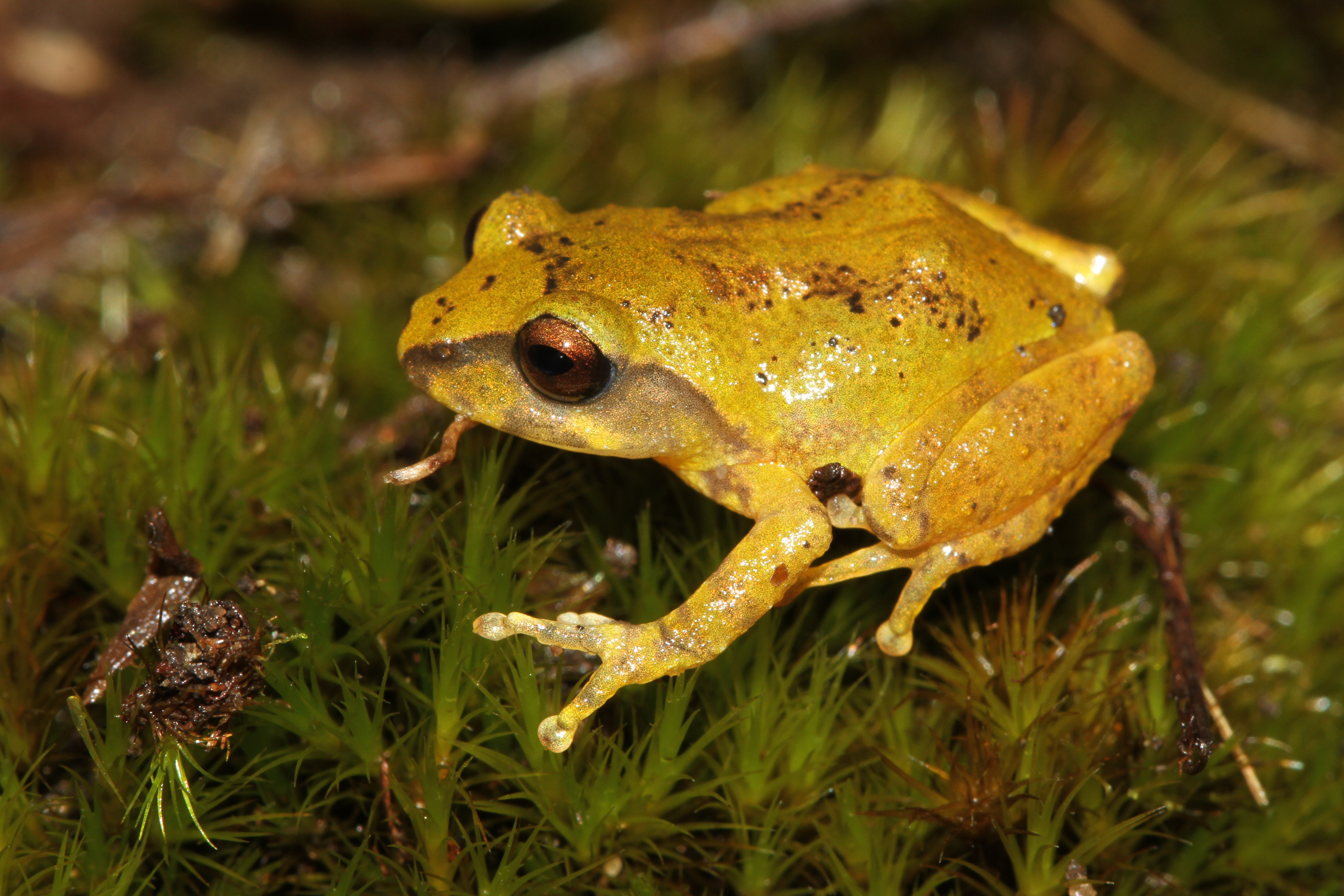

Conservation status
- Vulnerable (IUCN 3.1)

Scientific classification
- Kingdom: Animalia
- Phylum: Chordata
- Class: Amphibia
- Order: Anura
- Family: Rhacophoridae
- Genus: Raorchestes
- Species: R. dubois

Binomial name
- Raorchestes dubois (Biju and Bossuyt, 2006)

Synonyms
- Philautus dubois Biju and Bossuyt, 2006; Philautus duboisi (erroneous spelling); Pseudophilautus dubois (Biju & Bossuyt, 2006)

= Raorchestes dubois =

Koadaikanal bush frog

Species of frog

Raorchestes dubois or the Koadaikanal bush frog is a species of frog in the family Rhacophoridae.

It is known from the southern Western Ghats, near Kodaikanal in Dindigul District in the state of Tamil Nadu in India. It has been observed between 1900 and 2300 meters above sea level. Its habitats include roadside vegetation and gardens.

== Appearance ==
The adult male frog measures about 19.2 mm to 20.8 mm in snout-vent length and the adult female frog 25.1 mm to 25.3 mm.

The skin of the dorsum is green in color with some silver and blue-purple pigmentation. There is a mark in the shape of a V on the frog's back reaching from the eyes to the vent. The back and sides have black, brown, silver, and purple spots. The iris of the eye is gold-brown in color with some green and brown. The ends of the toes are white. The sides of the belly have yellow-brown marks.

== Life cycle ==
Like other frogs in Raorchestes, these frogs hatch from eggs as small froglets with no free-swimming tadpole stage.

== Name ==
The species is named in honour of Alain Dubois, a French herpetologist associated with the Paris Museum of Natural History.

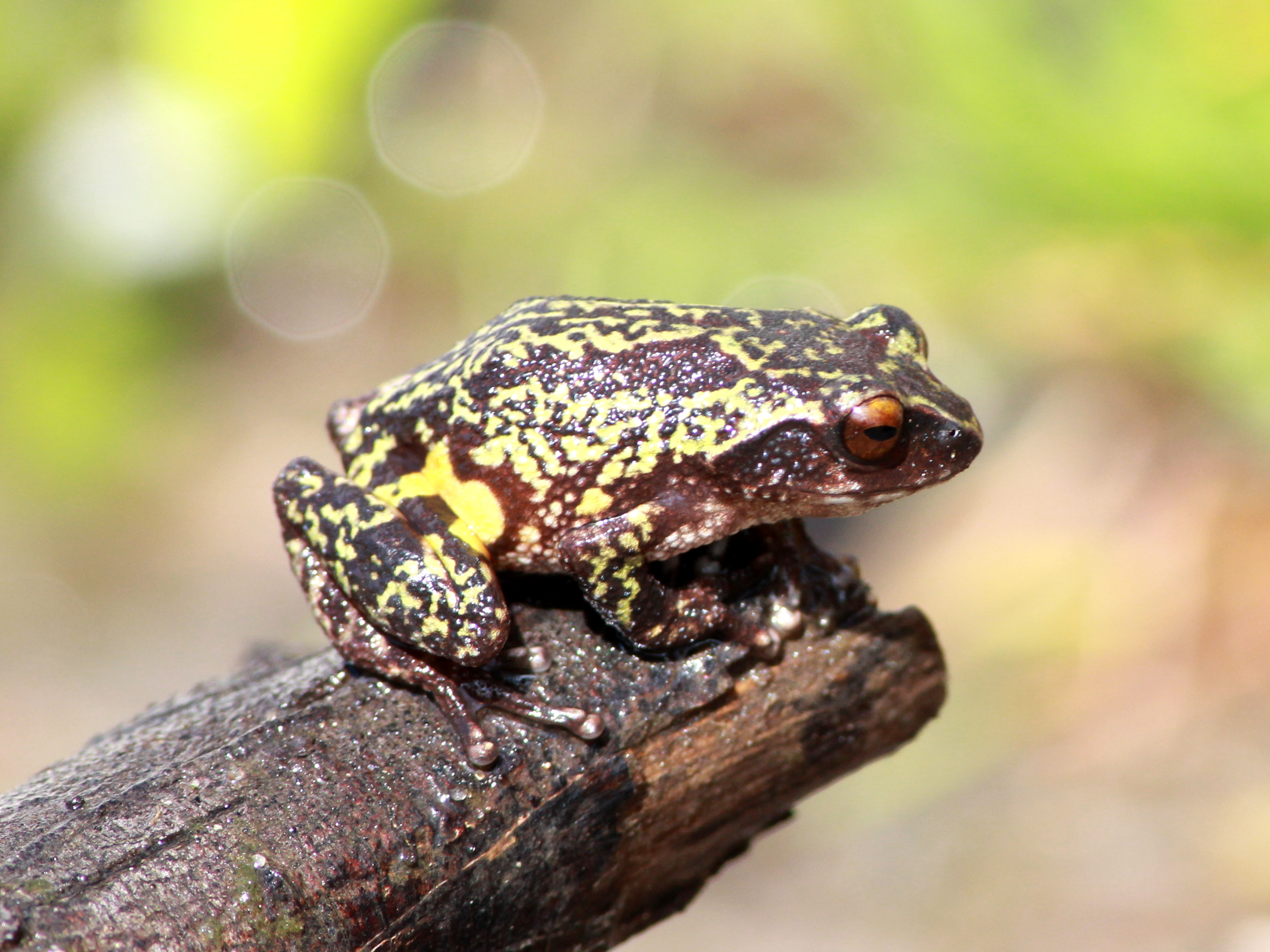
Kodaikanal bush frog Anamudi shola kerala
