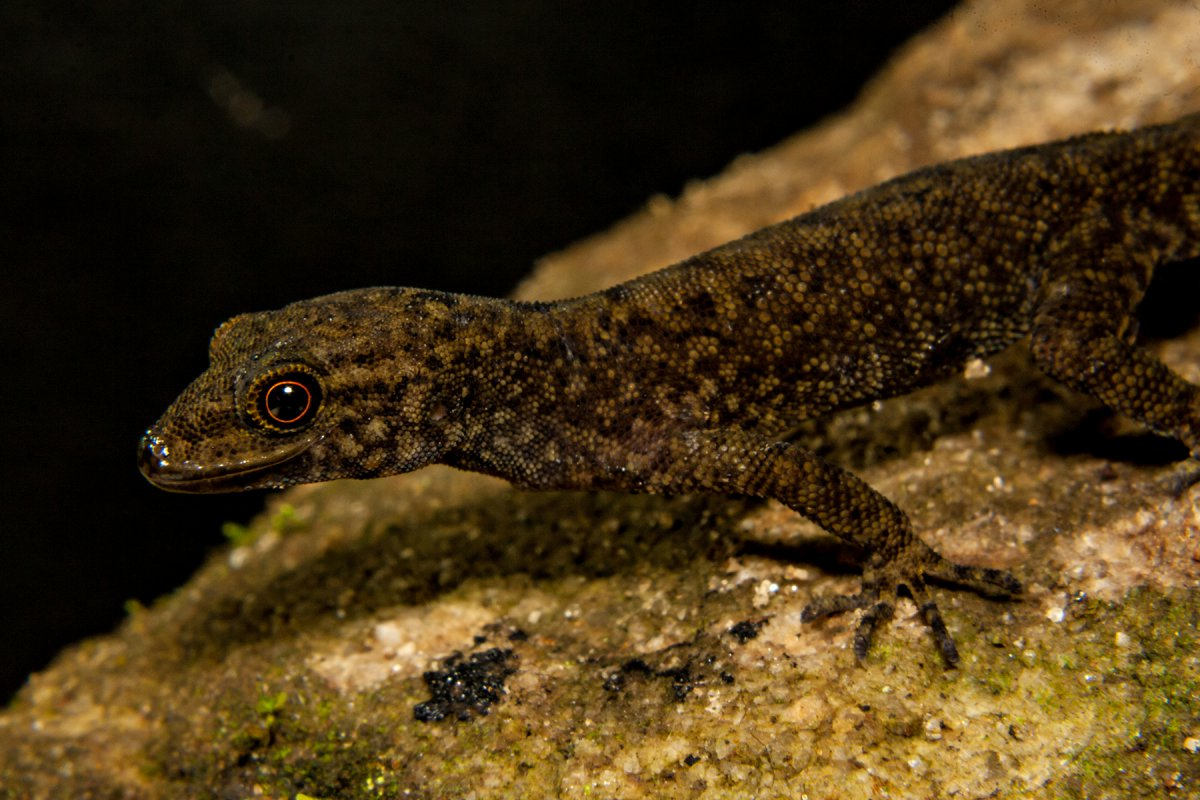

Conservation status
- Endangered (IUCN 3.1)

Scientific classification
- Domain: Eukaryota
- Kingdom: Animalia
- Phylum: Chordata
- Class: Reptilia
- Order: Squamata
- Infraorder: Gekkota
- Family: Gekkonidae
- Genus: Cnemaspis
- Species: C. wynadensis

Binomial name
- Cnemaspis wynadensis (Beddome, 1870)

Synonyms
- Gymnodactylus wynadensis Beddome, 1870

= Wynad day gecko =

Species of gecko

The Wynad day gecko (Cnemaspis wynadensis) is a species of gecko. It is endemic to the Western Ghats in Kerala, India, and only known from two locations, Wayanad and Silent Valley National Park.

== Description ==
The Wyanad day gecko has a similar habit to C. indicus. The basal part of the digits are beneath, with very small scales, and the two distal scales only being a little enlarged and plate-like. Its head is covered with very small granules, which are keeled on the snout. The upper surface of its body has large round granules, each with a raised central point or short keel, largest on the sides; these tubercles are either homogeneous or intermixed with much smaller ones, and as there occur specimens which are intermediate in this respect, no great importance can be attached to this difference. Abdominal scales are smooth. It has six upper and seven or eight lower labials. Males have four or five femoral pores on each side. The tail generally has a median series of transversely dilated plates below. In color, it is brown above, marbled with darker and lighter; the median dorsal line is sometimes lighter and dark-bordered; its underside is brownish, and the throat is brown-marbled; the tail underside is dark brown, and usually lighter spotted.

From snout to vent, it grows to 1.6 inches (4.1 cm); the tail is 1.8 inches (4.6 cm).

The type locality is "Wynaad and hill-ranges further south, in moist forests".
