= Raorchestes kakkayamensis =

Conservation status
- Data Deficient (IUCN 3.1)

Scientific classification
- Kingdom: Animalia
- Phylum: Chordata
- Class: Amphibia
- Order: Anura
- Family: Rhacophoridae
- Genus: Raorchestes
- Species: R. kakkayamensis

Binomial name
- Raorchestes kakkayamensis Garg et al., 2021

Species of frog

Raorchestes kakkayamensis, the Kakkayam shrub frog, is a species of frog in the family Rhacophoridae. It is endemic to India. Scientists know this frog exclusively from its type locality: Kakkayam in the Western Ghat mountains. This frog has been observed about 750 metres (2,460 ft) above sea level.

This frog has been observed in primary forest and nearby secondary forest, from ground level among the leaf litter to plants as high 3 metres (10 ft) tall.

Like other frogs in Raorchestes, this frog breeds through direct development.

== Taxonomy ==
Raorchestes kakkayamensis was described in 2021 by the herpetologist Sonali Garg and her colleagues based on an adult male specimen collected in Kakkayam, Kozhikode district in the Indian state of Kerala. The specific epithet is named after Kakkayam, where the type series was collected.

Raorchestes kakkayamensis is a member of the Raorchestes bombayensis group within its genus and is most closely related to R. leucolatus.

== Description ==
Raorchestes kakkayamensis is a small species, with a male snout–vent length of 17–19 mm and a female SVL of 24 mm. The dorsum is brown to reddish-brown, with a pair of dark discontinuous concave bands extending from behind the eye to the level of the groin, and a thin mid-dorsal line. There is a dark brown coloured horizontal band between the upper eyelids. The snout is lighter in colour than the dorsum, while the sides of the head are darker. The sides of the body are light brown with small off-white spots. The underside of the throat is blackish-brown with scattered white speckles. The chest and belly are light brown with dense dark brown speckling and irregular white spots. The groin and anterior surface of thighs are dark brown with distinct white blotches. The posterior side of the thighs is brown with scattered white spots. The limbs are dark brown, with white to ash blue spots, minute light brown speckling, and dark brown cross-bands. The finger and toe discs are yellowish-brown. The iris is brown with dense golden yellow speckling and faint dark brown horizontal and vertical bands.

The dorsal colouration and markings are slightly variable, ranging from light to dark brown or reddish-brown in colour, but there is a uniform triangular light brown colouration from the snout tip to the anterior margins of the eyes.

== Distribution and habitat ==
Raorchestes kakkayamensis is endemic to the Western Ghats and currently known only from its type locality of Kakkayam in Kozhikode district, north of Palghat gap in Kerala. The species was observed inside a primary forest patch and adjoining secondary forest areas at an elevation of 750 m. Individuals were located on the ground leaf litter or found perching on vegetation 1–3 m high.

== Vocalisations ==
Males produce a single type of call. The calls generally have a single pulse and are not delivered in groups. A typical call has duration of 25.3 ms, the amplitude envelope being characterised by a rise time of 9.2 ms and fall time of 15.9 ms, with a dominant frequency of 3.8 kHz.
