= Raorchestes theuerkaufi =

Conservation status
- Endangered (IUCN 3.1)

Scientific classification
- Kingdom: Animalia
- Phylum: Chordata
- Class: Amphibia
- Order: Anura
- Family: Rhacophoridae
- Genus: Raorchestes
- Species: R. theuerkaufi

Binomial name
- Raorchestes theuerkaufi Zachariah, Dinesh, Kunhikrishnan, Das, Raju, Radhakrishnan, Palot, and Kalesh, 2011

Species of amphibian

Raorchestes theuerkaufi is a species of frog of the genus Raorchestes found in the tea estates of Kadalar near Munnar, Idukki district, in the Western Ghats of Kerala in India. The species is named after Wolfgang Theuerkauf, a botanist and director of the Gurukula Botanical Sanctuary in Wayanad, Kerala.

== Habitat ==
This frog has been observed perched on rocks and leaf litter in secondary forests near tea and cardamom farms. People also saw this frog sitting on plants next roads. Sightings occurred between 1393 and 2000 meters above sea level.

The frog's range includes at least one protected park: Anamalai Tiger Reserve.

== Life cycle ==
Like other frogs in Raorchestes, this frog breeds through direct development with no free-swimming tadpole stage.

== Threats ==
Scientists cite pesticides and climate change as threats to this frog.

Scientists believe the fungus Batrachochytrium dendrobatidis can infect this frog. Batrachochytrium dendrobatidis causes the fungal disease chytridiomycosis.

== Original description ==
- Zachariah A; Dinesh KP; Kunhikrishnan E; Das S; Raju DV; Radhakrishnan C; Palot MJ; Kalesh S (2011). "Nine new species of frogs of the genus Raorchestes (Amphibia: Anura: Rhacophoridae) from southern Western Ghats, India". Biosystematica (Excerpt). 5 (1): 25–48.

== See also ==
- Raorchestes kadalarensis
