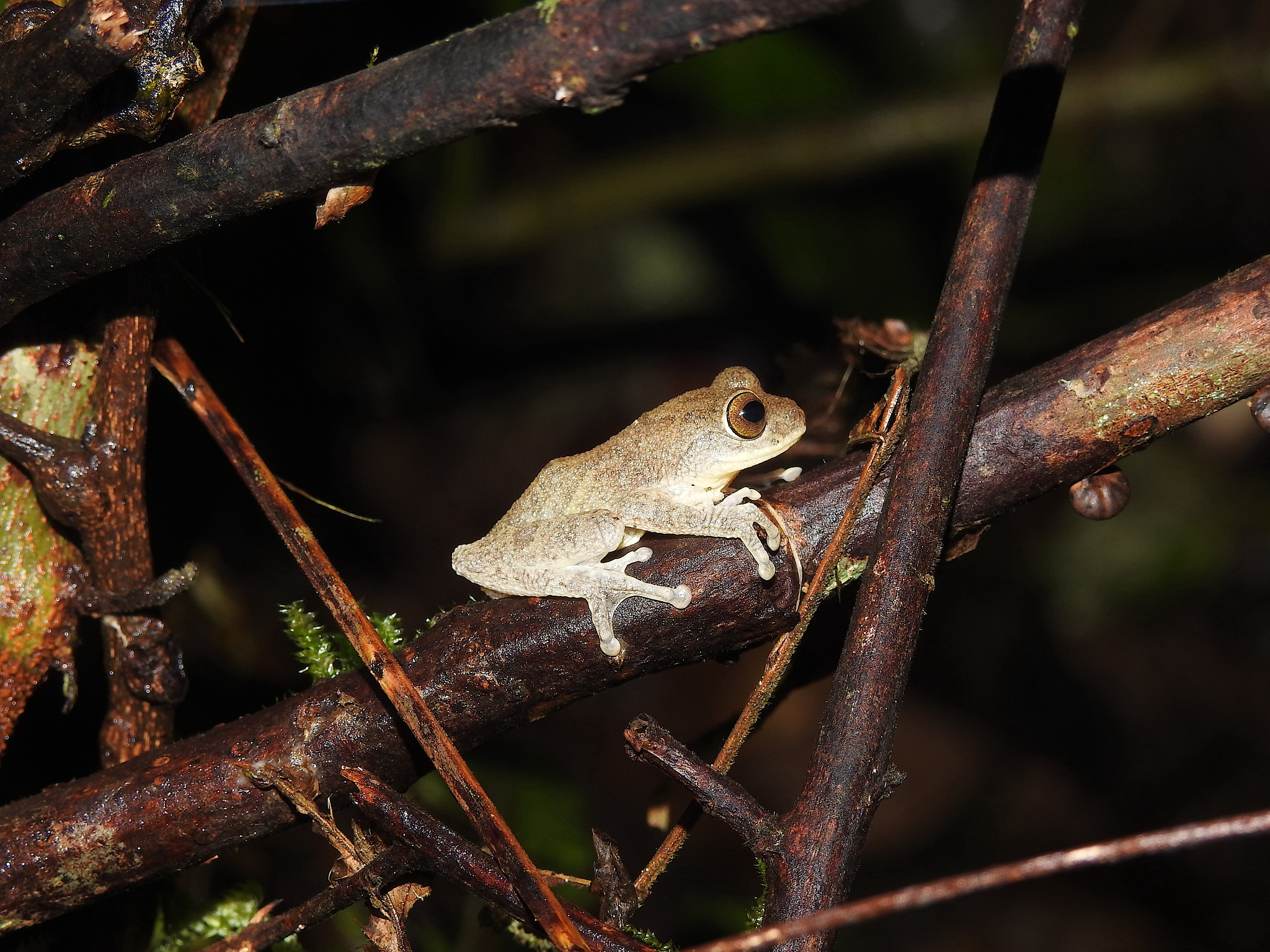

Conservation status
- Near Threatened (IUCN 3.1)

Scientific classification
- Kingdom: Animalia
- Phylum: Chordata
- Class: Amphibia
- Order: Anura
- Family: Rhacophoridae
- Genus: Raorchestes
- Species: R. hassanensis

Binomial name
- Raorchestes hassanensis (Dutta, 1985)

Synonyms
- Philautus montanus Rao, 1937 non Taylor, 1920; Philautus hassanensis Dutta, 1985

= Raorchestes hassanensis =

- From Karnataka, India.

Species of frog

Raorchestes hassanensis, the Hassan bush frog or Dutta's bubble-nest frog, is a species of frog in the family Rhacophoridae. It is endemic to India, including the Western Ghats.

Scientists once believed this population to be part of Raorchestes flaviventris but a reassessment was published in 2015.

This frog lives in evergreen and shola forests and has also been observed on coffee and tea plantations. It seems to tolerate some level of habitat disturbance but not an entirely open canopy.

Scientists classify this frog as near threatened because its moderate range faces only moderate threat and because the frog shows some ability to live in altered habitats. The fungus Batrachochytrium dendrobatidis can infect other frogs in Raorchestes, so the fungal disease chytridiomycosis may pose some threat as well.
