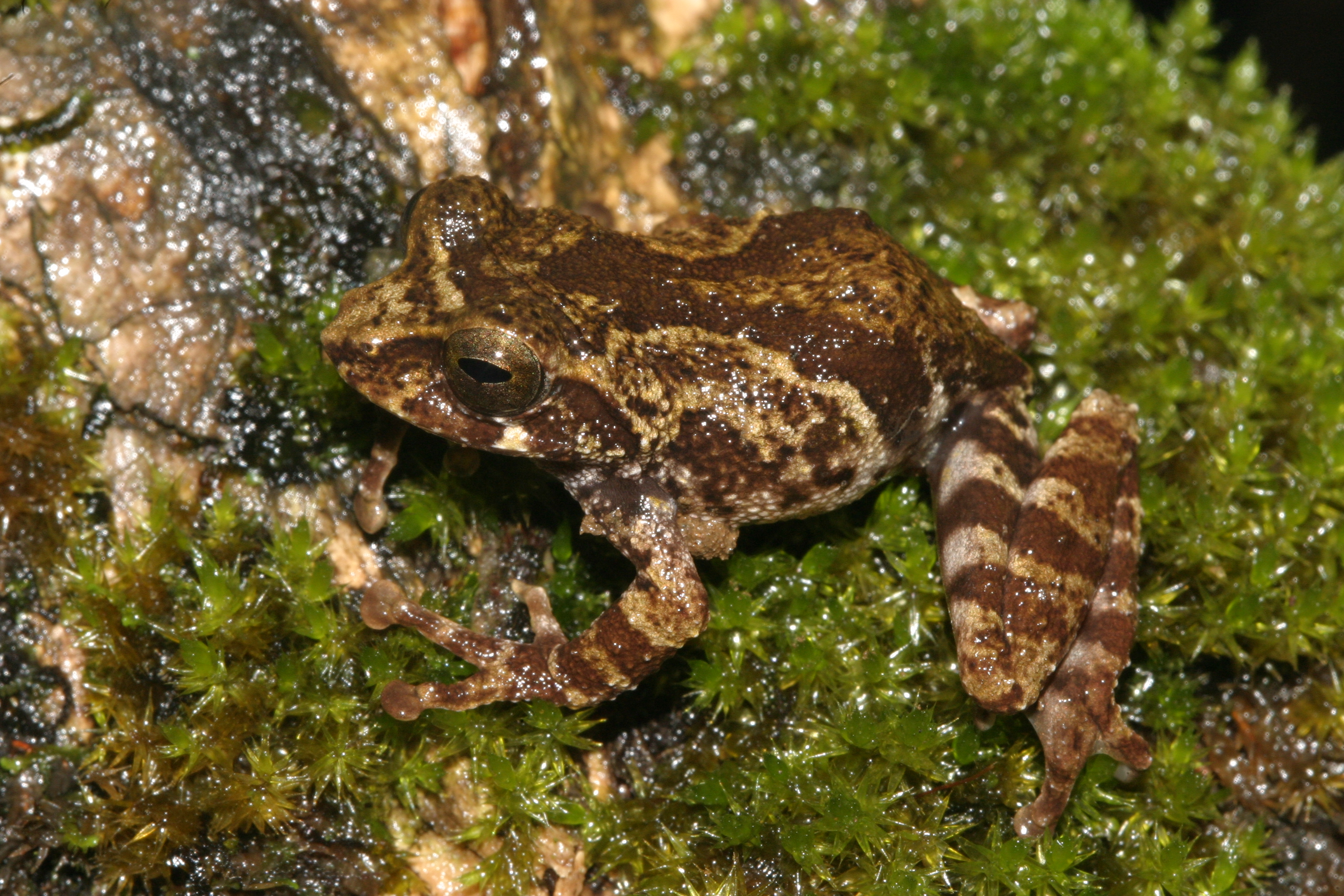

Conservation status
- Near Threatened (IUCN 3.1)

Scientific classification
- Kingdom: Animalia
- Phylum: Chordata
- Class: Amphibia
- Order: Anura
- Family: Rhacophoridae
- Genus: Raorchestes
- Species: R. crustai

Binomial name
- Raorchestes crustai Zachariah, Dinesh, Kunhikrishnan, Das, Raju, Radhakrishnan, Palot, and Kalesh, 2011

= Raorchestes crustai =

Species of amphibian

Raorchestes crustai is a species of frog in the family Rhacophoridae. It is found in Bonacaud in the Western Ghats of Kerala, India where it has been observed between 600 and 1500 meters above sea level.

== Original description ==
- Zachariah A; Dinesh KP; Kunhikrishnan E; Das S; Raju DV; Radhakrishnan C; Palot MJ; Kalesh S (2011). "Nine new species of frogs of the genus Raorchestes (Amphibia: Anura: Rhacophoridae) from southern Western Ghats, India". Biosystematica (Preview). 5 (1): 25–48.
