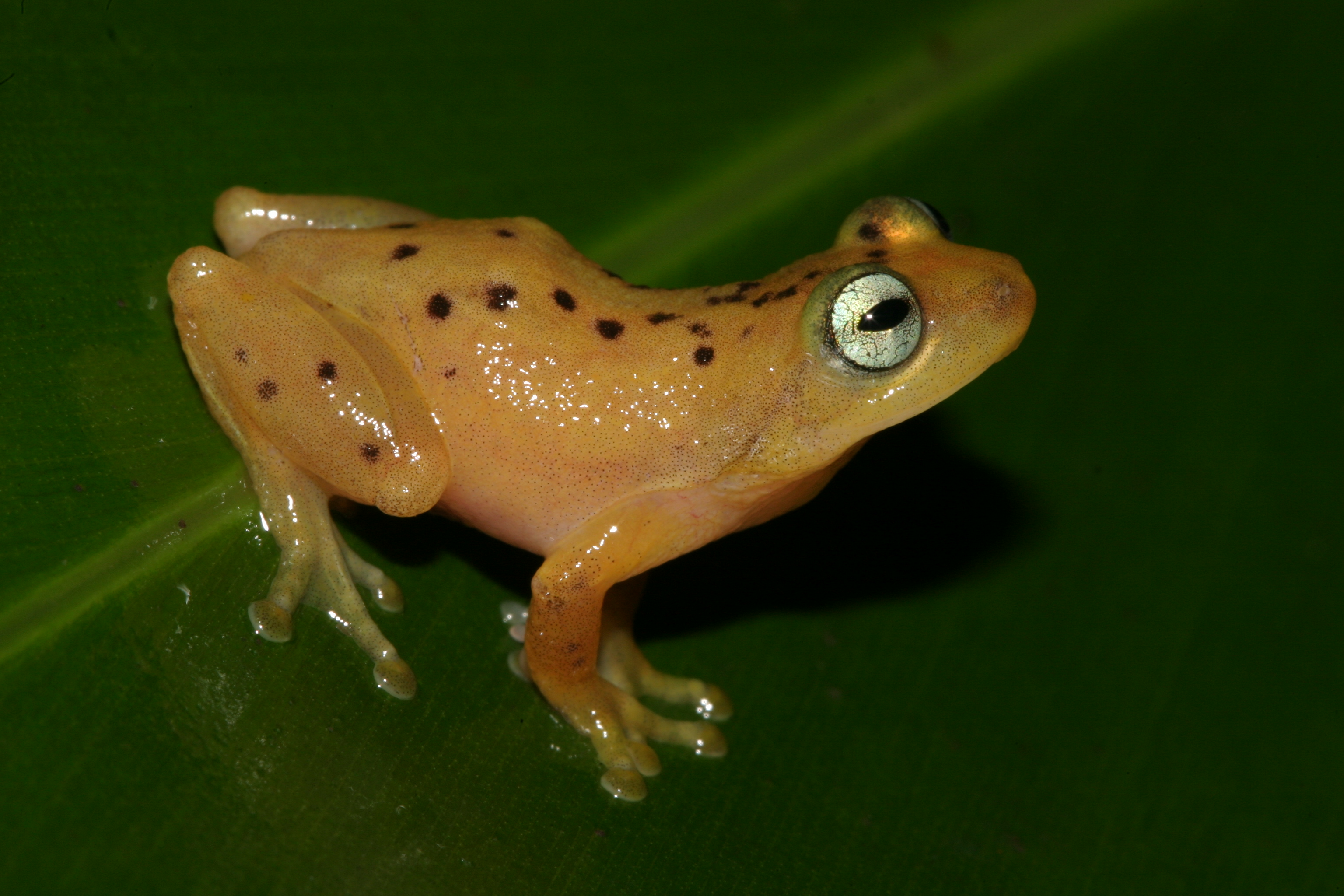
- Raorchestes manohari

Conservation status
- Endangered (IUCN 3.1)

Scientific classification
- Kingdom: Animalia
- Phylum: Chordata
- Class: Amphibia
- Order: Anura
- Family: Rhacophoridae
- Genus: Raorchestes
- Species: R. manohari

Binomial name
- Raorchestes manohari Zachariah, Dinesh, Kunhikrishnan, Das, Raju, Radhakrishnan, Palot, and Kalesh, 2011

= Raorchestes manohari =

Species of amphibian

Raorchestes manohari is a species of frog of the genus Raorchestes found in Bonacaud in the Western Ghats of Kerala in India. The species is named after T. M. Manoharan, Principal Chief Conservator of Forests, Kerala.

The adult frog measures about 17.57–18.06 mm in snout-vent length. The skin of the dorsum is bright yellow with brown-black spots. It is not smooth. The flanks are lighter yellow in color. The frog's belly is white in color.

Scientists observed the frog on reed plants of the species Ochlandra travancorica on plantations and in forests. Scientists believe the frogs depend on the reeds to live and will not tolerate habitat disturbance. The frog breeds by direct development in bamboo plants.

Scientists classify this frog as endangered because of its small range.

== Original description ==
- Zachariah A; Dinesh KP; Kunhikrishnan E; Das S; Raju DV; Radhakrishnan C; Palot MJ; Kalesh S (2011). "Nine new species of frogs of the genus Raorchestes (Amphibia: Anura: Rhacophoridae) from southern Western Ghats, India". Biosystematica (Excerpt). 5 (1): 25–48.
