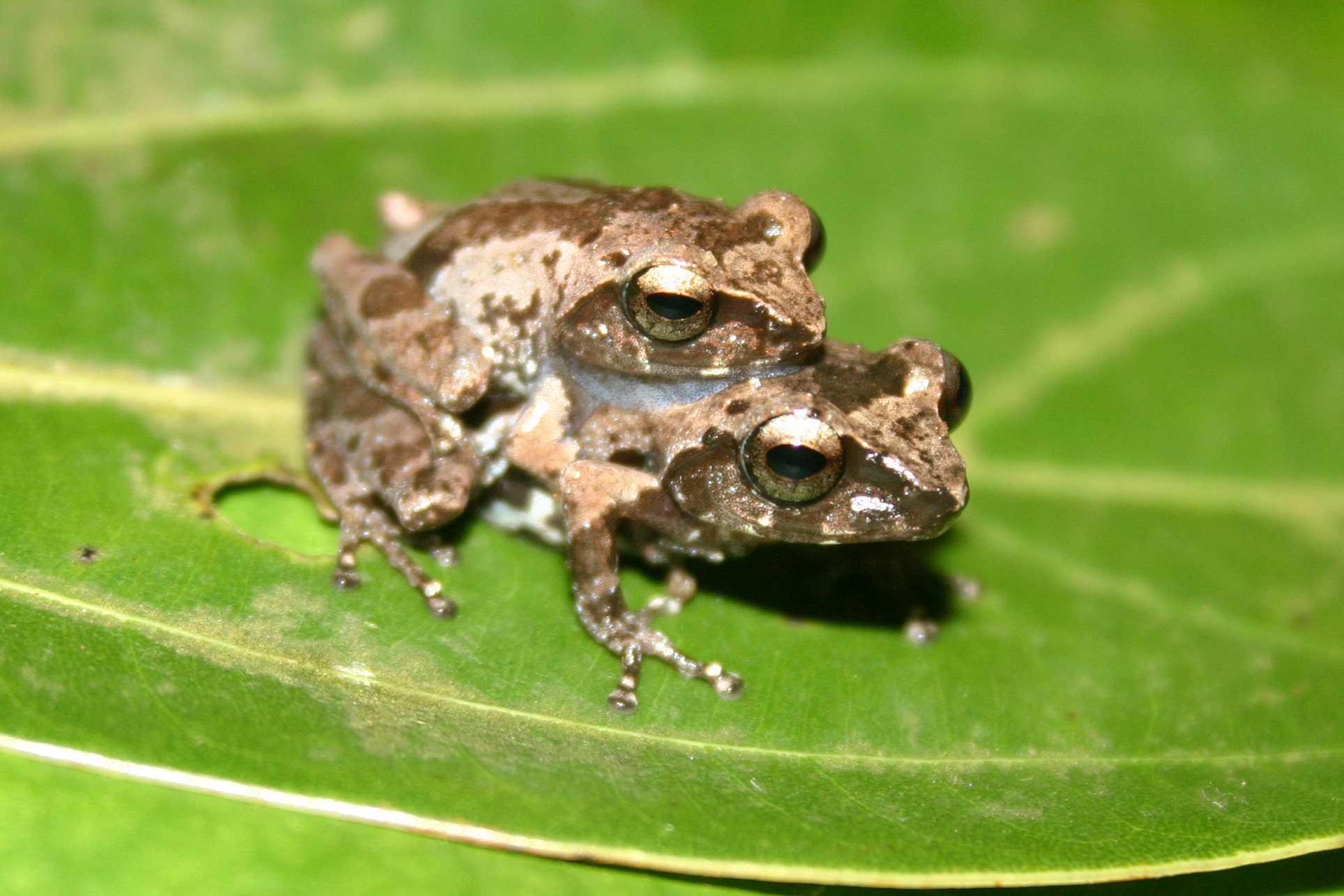

Conservation status
- Near Threatened (IUCN 3.1)

Scientific classification
- Kingdom: Animalia
- Phylum: Chordata
- Class: Amphibia
- Order: Anura
- Family: Rhacophoridae
- Genus: Raorchestes
- Species: R. agasthyaensis

Binomial name
- Raorchestes agasthyaensis Zachariah, Dinesh, Kunhikrishnan, Das, Raju, Radhakrishnan, Palot & Kalesh, 2011

= Raorchestes agasthyaensis =

Species of amphibian

Raorchestes agasthyaensis, the Agasthiamalai bushfrog, is a frog found in the Western Ghats of Kerala, India, particularly in Bonacaud near Ponmudi as well as nearby areas of Thiruvananthapuram and Kollam districts. The species is named after Agasthyamalai, its type locality.

This frog has been found on shrubs and other low plants on and near tea plantations, in evergreen forests, and in areas that have been to selective logging but not clear-cutting to get wood to build with. This frog breeds through direct development with no free-swimming tadpole stage.

This frog's range includes protected areas.

== Original description ==
- Zachariah A; Dinesh KP; Kunhikrishnan E; Das S; Raju DV; Radhakrishnan C; Palot MJ; Kalesh S (2011). "Nine new species of frogs of the genus Raorchestes (Amphibia: Anura: Rhacophoridae) from southern Western Ghats, India". Biosystematica (Excerpt). 5 (1): 25–48.
