= Raorchestes keirasabinae =

Conservation status
- Vulnerable (IUCN 3.1)

Scientific classification
- Kingdom: Animalia
- Phylum: Chordata
- Class: Amphibia
- Order: Anura
- Family: Rhacophoridae
- Genus: Raorchestes
- Species: R. keirasabinae

Binomial name
- Raorchestes keirasabinae Garg, Suyesh, Das, Bee, and Biju, 2021

Species of frog

Roarchestes keirasabinae, or Keira's shrub frog, is a species of frog in the family Rhacophoridae, endemic to India. Scientists have observed it in many places within the Western Ghat mountains, all between 100 and 1,000 meters above sea level. This frog has been observed in forests, including a few secondary forests, high in the canopy. Scientists believe this frog breeds through direct development like other frogs in Raorchestes. It is classified as vulnerable to extinction despite its large range, and heavy fragmentation from agriculture.

== Taxonomy ==
Raorchestes keirasabinae was described in 2021 by the herpetologist Sonali Garg and her colleagues, based on an adult male specimen collected in Chathankod-Makki, Thiruvananthapuram district in the Indian state of Kerala. The species is named after Keira Sabin, to honour the Andrew Sabin Family Foundation's support for amphibian research and conservation. Raorchestes keirasabinae is a member of the Raorchestes nerostagona group within its genus and is most closely related to R. nerostagona.

== Morphology ==
Raorchestes keirasabinae is a medium-sized species, with a male snout–vent length of 29–31 mm. The anterior part of the dorsum is brown with black and dark brown patches, while the posterior half is green with grey patches. The snout is light green dorsally, and the sides of the head are dark greyish-brown. The underside is off-white, with variable amounts of brown or grey spots forming a vermiculated pattern.

The throat is darker than the belly, with dark grey margins and bands along the lips. The dorsal surface of the fore and hindlimbs is light greyish-brown, with irregular dark grey and light green cross-bands. The sides of the belly have brown and grey mottling. The groin and anterior parts of the thigh are brown with white patches. The posterior edges of the thigh and shank are dark chocolate-brown. The hands and feet are green-tinged brownish-grey. The iris is reddish-grey with a faint horizontal brown band. The colour and markings of the dorsum are variable and possibly adapted to the frog's surroundings.

== Distribution and habitat ==
Raorchestes keirasabinae is endemic to the Western Ghats of Kerala and is currently known from elevations of 100–1,000 m south of the Palghat gap. It has been observed at Agasthyamalai Biosphere Reserve in the districts of Thiruvananthapuram and Kollam, and Periyar National Park in the district of Idukki. Since the species inhabits the highest canopy layers and cannot be located easily, it could have a wider geographical range in the Western Ghats regions south of Palghat gap, both in Kerala and the adjoining state of Tamil Nadu.
