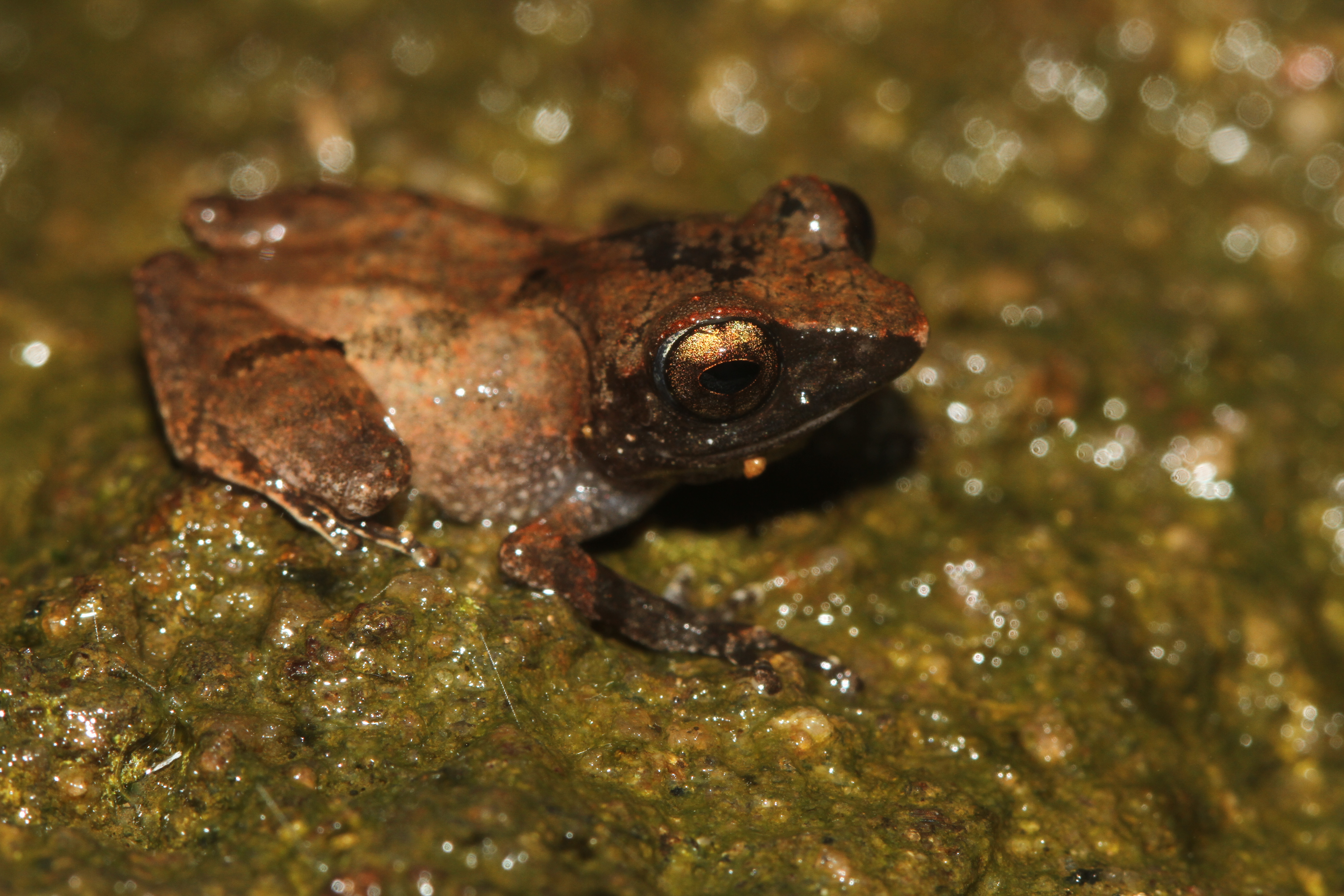

Conservation status
- Near Threatened (IUCN 3.1)

Scientific classification
- Kingdom: Animalia
- Phylum: Chordata
- Class: Amphibia
- Order: Anura
- Family: Rhacophoridae
- Genus: Raorchestes
- Species: R. archeos

Binomial name
- Raorchestes archeos Vijaykumar et al., 2014

= Raorchestes archeos =

Species of amphibian

Raorchestes archeos is a species of frog endemic to the Western Ghats of India. It is known from wet evergreen forests in the Agasthyamalai and Devarmalai ranges between Kerala and Tamil Nadu. It has been observed between 500 and 1071 meters above sea level.

Scientists classify this frog as near threatened, largely from anthropogenic changes to its habitat and possibly pesticides. However, the frog has shown some ability to tolerate disturbed habitats. The frog's range includes the Agasthyamala Biosphere Reserve, where many people arrive on an annual pilgrimage. They leave behind litter and collect wood for firewood.

== Original description ==
- Vijayakumar SP; Dinesh KP; Prabhu MV; Shanker K (2014). "Lineage delimitation and description of nine new species of bush frogs (Anura: Raochestes, Rhacophoridae) from the Western Ghats escarpment". Zootaxa. 3893: 451–488.
