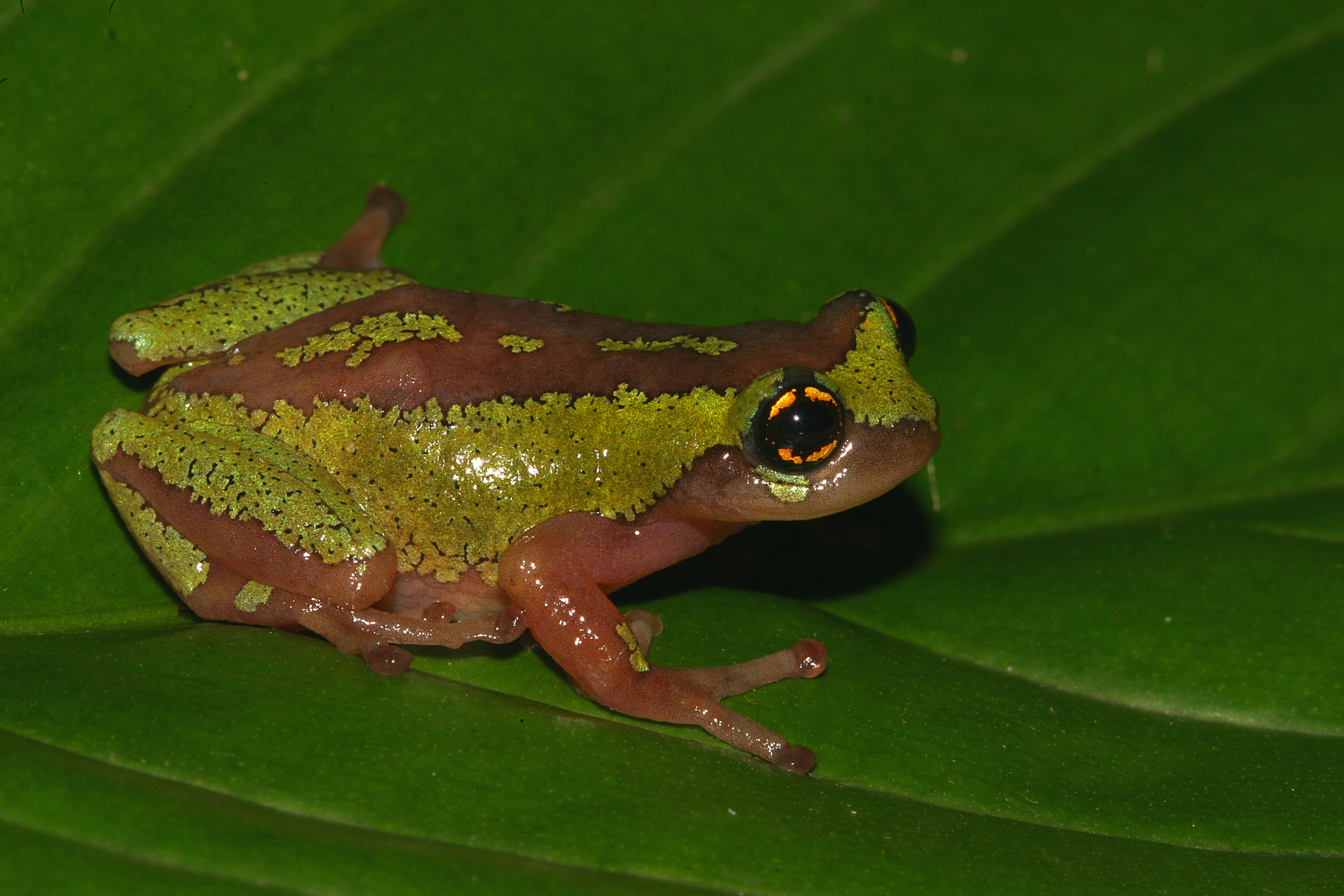

Conservation status
- Endangered (IUCN 3.1)

Scientific classification
- Kingdom: Animalia
- Phylum: Chordata
- Class: Amphibia
- Order: Anura
- Family: Rhacophoridae
- Genus: Raorchestes
- Species: R. flaviocularis

Binomial name
- Raorchestes flaviocularis Vijayakumar, Dinesh, Prabhu, and Shanker, 2014

= Raorchestes flaviocularis =

Species of frog

Raorchestes flaviocularis is a species of frog in the family Rhacophoridae. It is endemic to India. It has been observed between 1459 and 1569 meters above sea level in the Western Ghat mountains. It has been observed between 1400 and 1600 meters above sea level.

This frog has been observed on Ochlandra grass and high up in the forest canopy.

Scientists say classify this frog as endangered because of its small, fragmented range, which is subject to further degradation. Climate chance poses a particular problem because so much of the population lives at higher elevations, making it unlikely the frog would be able to migrate north if its range were to grow . The fungus Batrachochytrium dendrobatidis, which causes the disease chytridiomycosis, can infect other frogs in Raorchestes and may infect this frog.

== Original description ==
- Vijayakumar SP; Dinesh KP; Prabhu MV; Shanker K (2014). "Lineage delimitation and description of nine new species of bush frogs (Anura: Raochestes, Rhacophoridae) from the Western Ghats escarpment". Zootaxa. 3893: 451–488.
