= Raorchestes blandus =

Conservation status
- Critically Endangered (IUCN 3.1)

Scientific classification
- Kingdom: Animalia
- Phylum: Chordata
- Class: Amphibia
- Order: Anura
- Family: Rhacophoridae
- Genus: Raorchestes
- Species: R. blandus

Binomial name
- Raorchestes blandus Vijayakumar, Dinesh, Prabhu, and Shanker, 2014

Species of frog

Roarchestes blandus or the Anamalai bush frog is a species of frog in the family Rhacophoridae. It is endemic to India. Scientists have observed it in the Western Ghat mountains, between 45 and 806 meters above sea level.

This frog is found in evergreen forests at low to middle elevations. It lives in the understorey and seems to require that level of the forest to be intact. This frog breeds through direct development with no free-swimming tadpole stage.

Scientists classify this frog as critically endangered because its range covers only 859 square kilometers and because that area is still subject to degradation, especially for the establishment of rubber and arecanut plantations. Scientists have also observed morbidity due to the fungus Batrachochytrium dendrobatidis but have not confirmed mortality.

This frog's range includes two protected parks: Parambikulam Tiger Reserve and Anamalai Tiger Reserve.

== Original description ==
- Vijayakumar SP; Dinesh KP; Prabhu MV; Shanker K (2014). "Lineage delimitation and description of nine new species of bush frogs (Anura: Raochestes, Rhacophoridae) from the Western Ghats escarpment". Zootaxa. 3893: 451–488.
