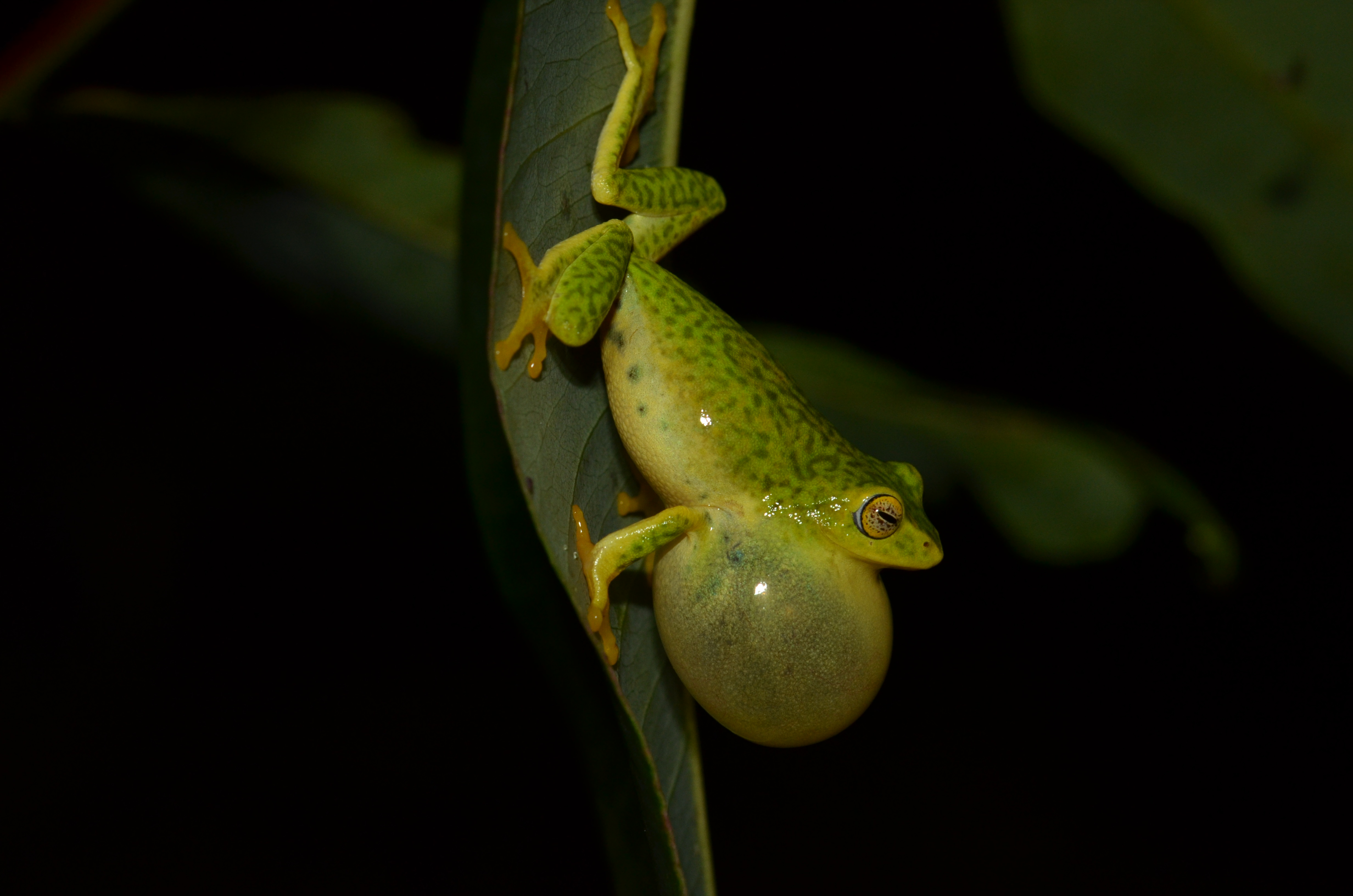
- Male Jayaram's bush frog calling

Conservation status
- Endangered (IUCN 3.1)

Scientific classification
- Kingdom: Animalia
- Phylum: Chordata
- Class: Amphibia
- Order: Anura
- Family: Rhacophoridae
- Genus: Raorchestes
- Species: R. jayarami

Binomial name
- Raorchestes jayarami (Biju & Bossuyt, 2009)

Synonyms
- Philautus jayarami Biju and Bossuyt, 2009; Pseudophilautus jayarami Biju & Bossuyt, 2009

= Raorchestes jayarami =

Jayaram's bush frog

Species of frog

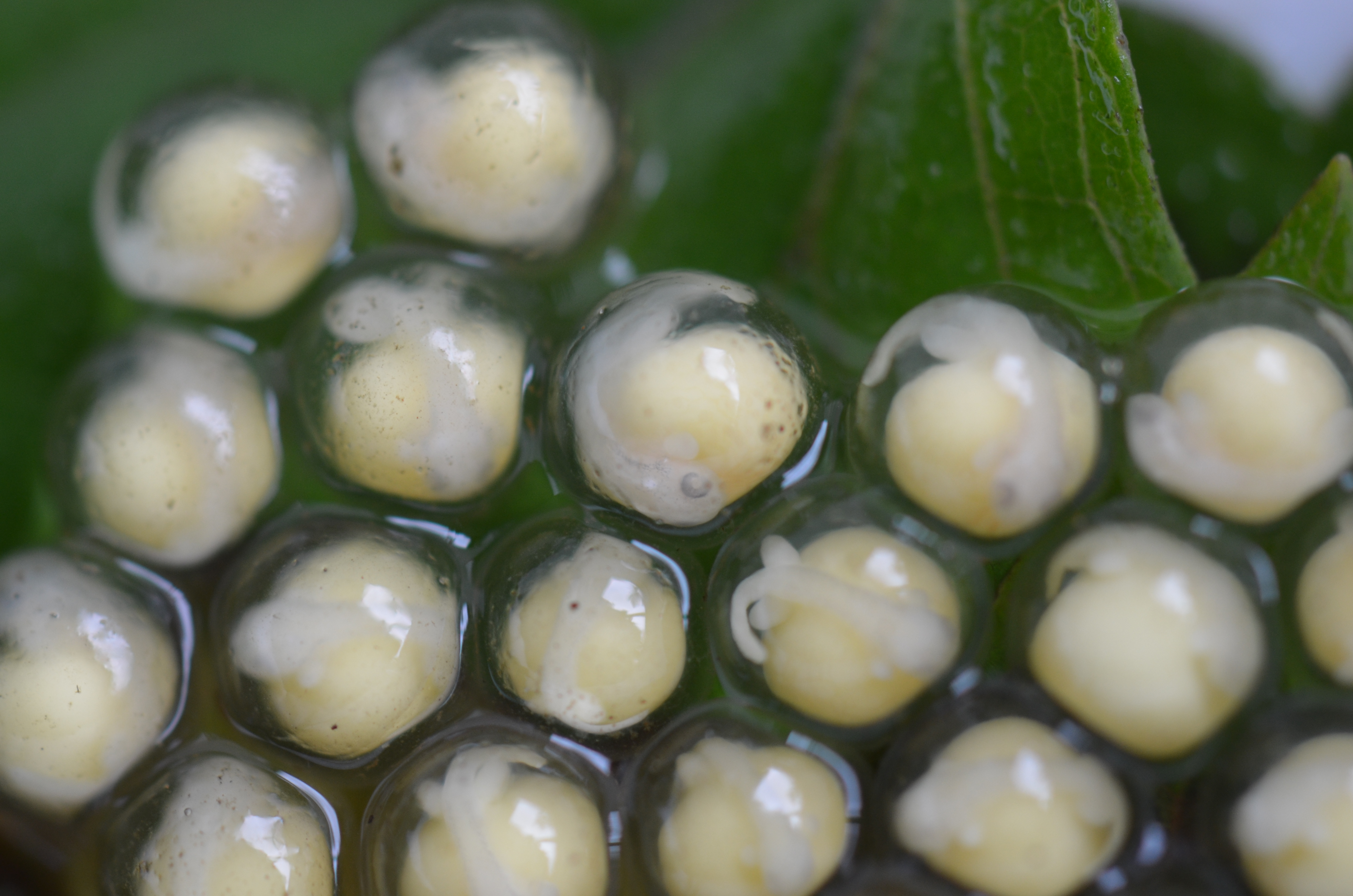
Direct developing eggs of Raorchestes jayarami.

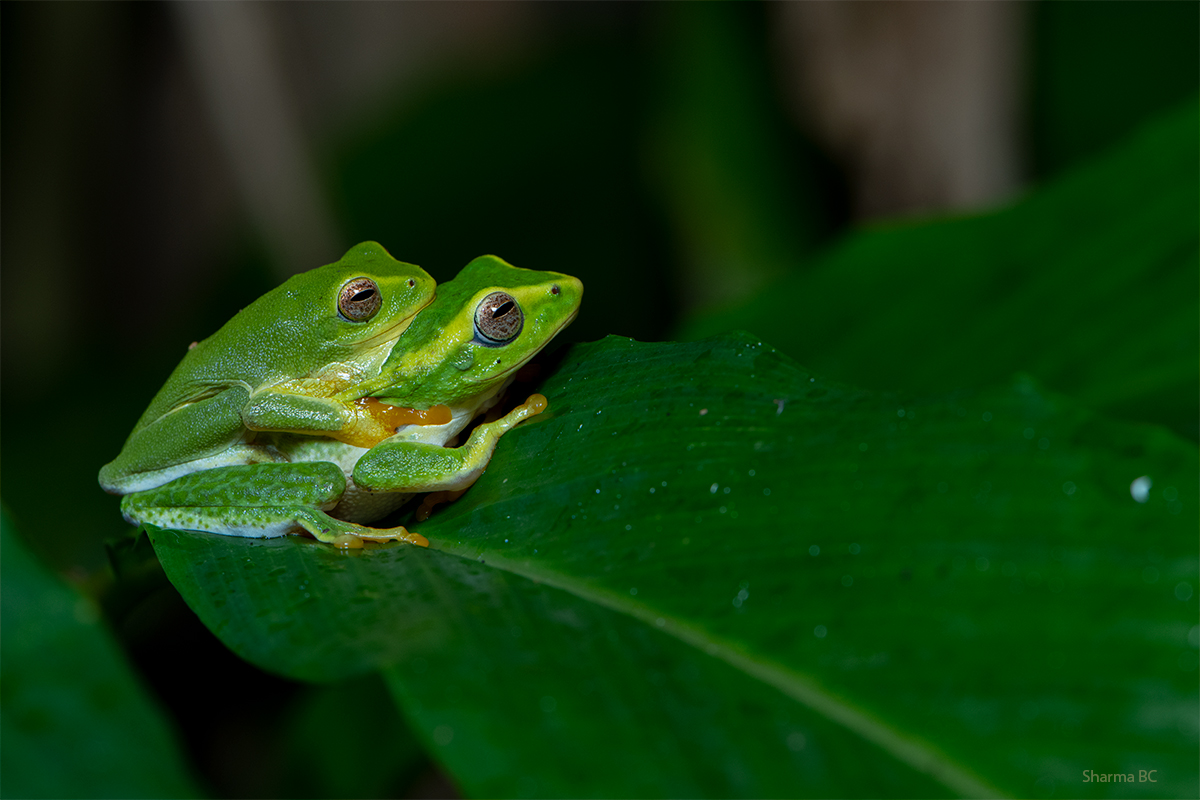

Raorchestes jayarami, also known as Jayaram's bush frog, is a species of frog from the subfamily rhacophoridae found in Valparai in the Western Ghats of Tamil Nadu in India, where it has been observed between 600 and 1800 meters above sea level.

== Appearance ==
Individuals of this species from the genus Raorchestes have morphs that range from plain green to variations with splotches and dots of darker greens and in some cases yellow. Anuran's from the genus Raorchestes, show direct-development while allows them to be independent from a waterbody for the development of tadpoles.

== Habitat ==
This frog has been observed inhabiting small patches of forest and shola in between human settlements. There have been a few sightings on tea plantations.

== Threats ==
Scientists classify this frog is endangered because of its small, heavily fragmented range. Its habitat is subject to deforestation associated with logging and agriculture. Parts of the frog's habitat in the Western Ghats is the site of an annual pilgrimage. These visitors disturb the frog and burn grassland to create space.

Scientists also name climate change as a threat to this species. Given that the populations live at high elevations, they cannot simply migrate north if their range should warm.

This frog is occasionally used in traditional medicine for children's coughs, inability to speak, and inability to walk.

Scientists have observed the fungus Batrachochytrium dendrobatidis on other frogs in Raorchestes, so they believe it can infect R. jayarami as well. Batrachochytrium dendrobatidis causes the fungal disease chytridiomycosis.
