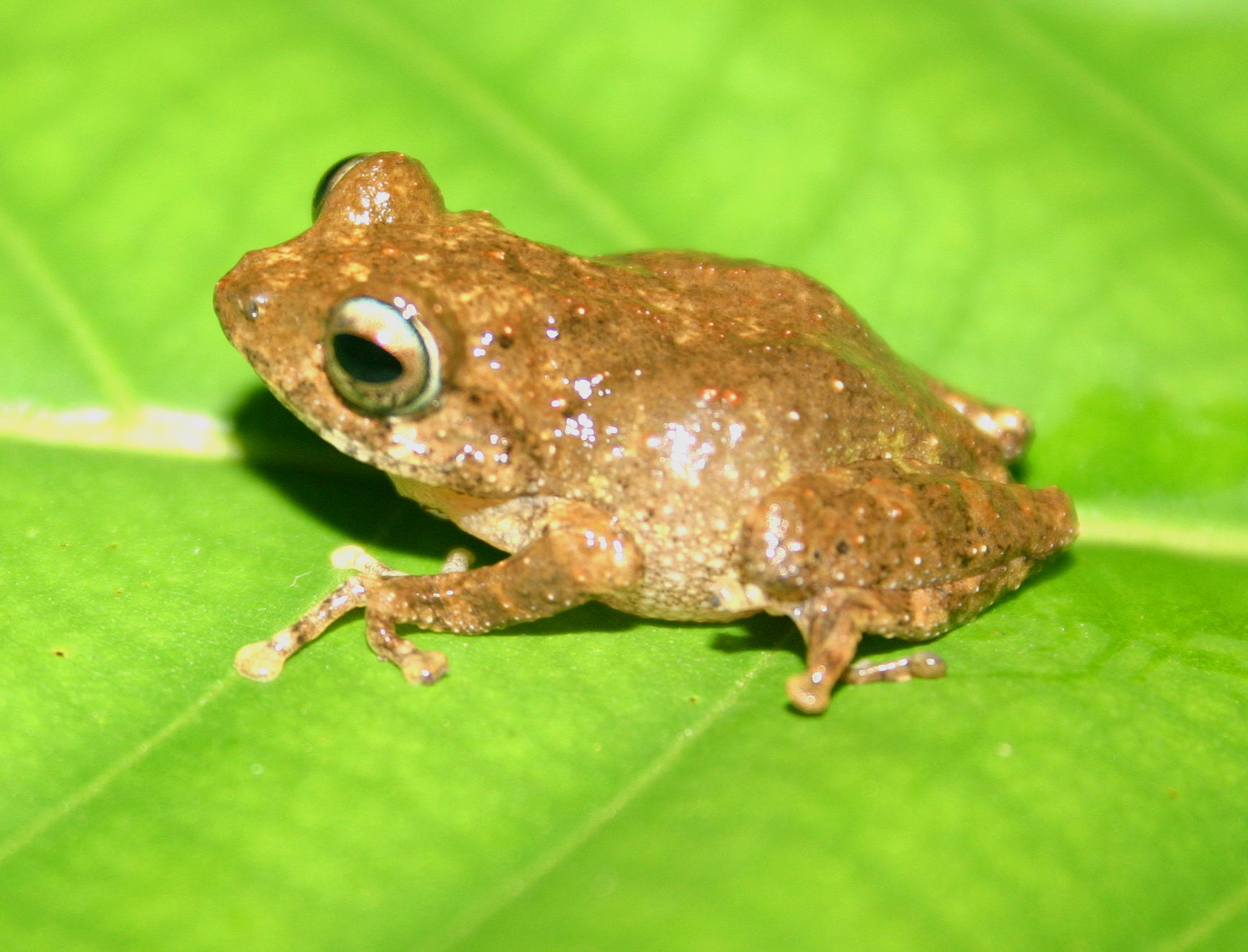

Conservation status
- Endangered (IUCN 3.1)

Scientific classification
- Kingdom: Animalia
- Phylum: Chordata
- Class: Amphibia
- Order: Anura
- Family: Rhacophoridae
- Genus: Raorchestes
- Species: R. chotta

Binomial name
- Raorchestes chotta (Biju & Bossuyt, 2009)

Synonyms
- Philautus chotta Biju and Bossuyt, 2009; Pseudophilautus chotta Biju & Bossuyt, 2009

= Raorchestes chotta =

Small bushfrog

Species of frog

Raorchestes chotta, also known as the small bushfrog or small bush frog, is a species of frog found only in Ponmudi in the Western Ghats of Kerala, India. This frog lays eggs attached to the underside of a leaf. They hatch as tiny froglets, skipping the tadpole stage. The frog has been observed between 600 and 980 meters above sea level.

Scientists classify this frog as endangered because of its small, fragmented range, which is still subject to considerable degradation. Human beings convert the forest to tea and areca nut plantations, and scientists suspect infrastructure from tourism may also cause problems. Although the frog's range includes one park, Ponmudi Reserve Forest, the management in this forest is not the best.

Scientists believe the chytridiomycosis-inducing fungus Batrachochytrium dendrobatidis could infect this frog because it has been observed on other frogs in Raorchestes, but it has not been formally confirmed.

== Original description ==
- Biju SD; Bossuyt F (2009). "Systematics and phylogeny of Philautus Gistel, 1848 (Anura, Rhacophoridae) in the Western Ghats of India, with descriptions of 12 new species". Zool J Linn Soc (Abstract). 155 (2): 374–444. doi:10.1111/j.1096-3642.2008.00466.x.
