= Raorchestes lechiya =

Conservation status
- Data Deficient (IUCN 3.1)

Scientific classification
- Kingdom: Animalia
- Phylum: Chordata
- Class: Amphibia
- Order: Anura
- Family: Rhacophoridae
- Genus: Raorchestes
- Species: R. lechiya

Binomial name
- Raorchestes lechiya Zachariah, Cyriac, Chandramohan, Ansil, Mathew, Raju, and Abraham, 2016

Species of frog

Raorchestes lechiya, or Lechiyappan's bush frog, is a species of frog in the family Rhacophoridae. It is endemic to India. Scientists know it exclusively from the type locality: 2023 meters above sea level in Silent Valley National Park. This frog has been observed between 1800 and 2200 meters above sea level.

Scientists found one adult male frog that was about 19.8 mm long from nose to rear end. The skin of the dorsum was pale brown in color and it had many small spicules. There were whitish spots near its legs. The skin of the frog's venter was pink-white in color. The iris of the eye was the color of copper on the uppermost third and dark brown on the lower two thirds. Scientists observed the frogs in the leaf litter and on shrubs.

The frog is named for Mr. Lechiyappan of the Mudugar tribe. He worked as a forest tracker at Silent Valley National Park and it in fact became a national park through his efforts.
