= Raorchestes aureus =

Conservation status
- Critically Endangered (IUCN 3.1)

Scientific classification
- Kingdom: Animalia
- Phylum: Chordata
- Class: Amphibia
- Order: Anura
- Family: Rhacophoridae
- Genus: Raorchestes
- Species: R. aureus

Binomial name
- Raorchestes aureus Vijayakumar, Dinesh, Prabhu, and Shanker, 2014

Species of frog

Raorchestes archeos is a species of frog in the family Rhacophoridae. It is endemic to India, where it has been observed in the Western Ghat mountains at about 1524 meters above sea level.

This frog has been observed in grasses near the edges of forests and in disturbed forest near disturbed grassland.

Scientists classify this frog as critically endangered because its range is only ten square kilometers and subject to continued degradation, especially deforestation in favor of coffee plantations.
