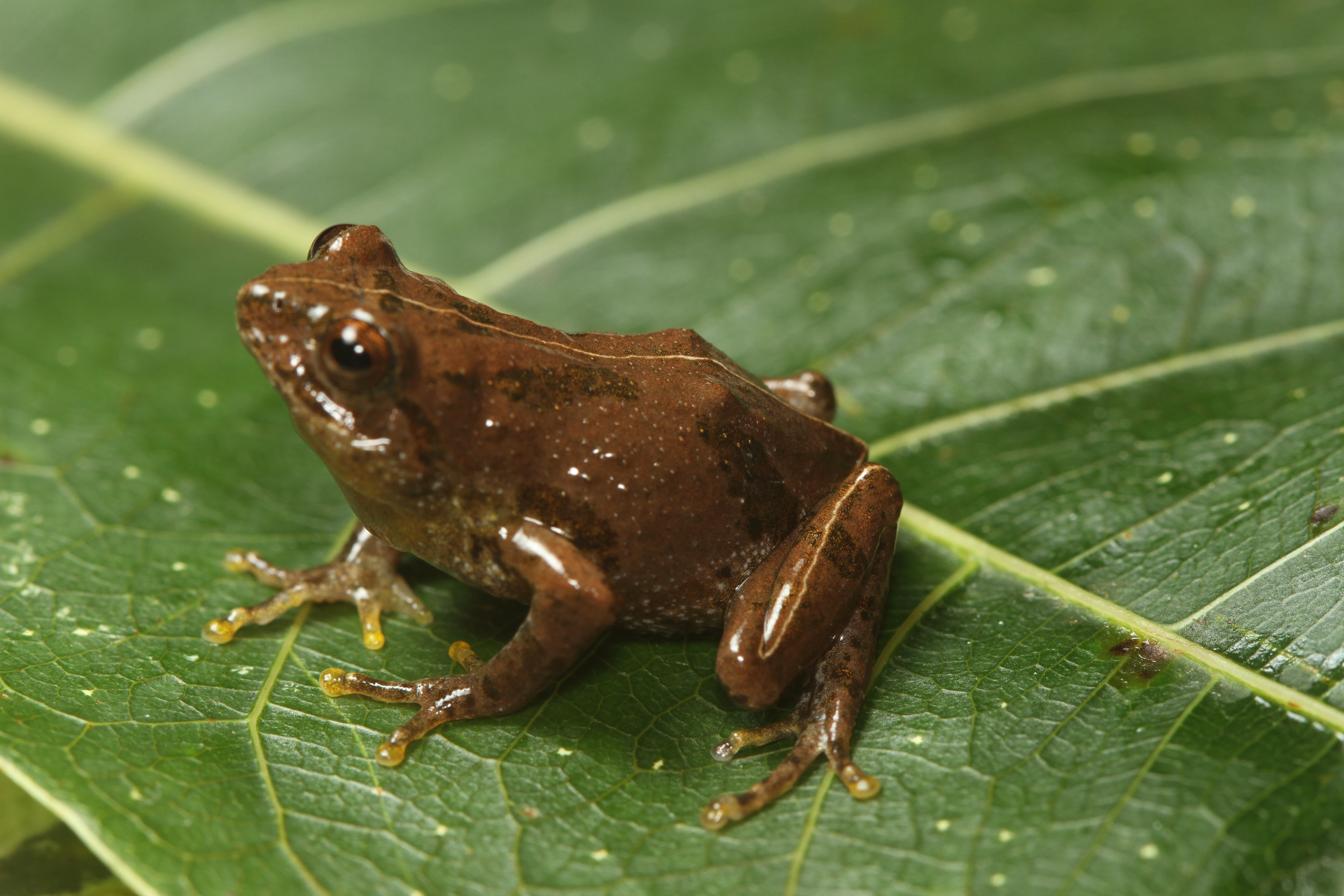

Conservation status
- Vulnerable (IUCN 3.1)

Scientific classification
- Kingdom: Animalia
- Phylum: Chordata
- Class: Amphibia
- Order: Anura
- Family: Rhacophoridae
- Genus: Raorchestes
- Species: R. echinatus

Binomial name
- Raorchestes echinatus Vijayakumar, Dinesh, Prabhu, and Shanker, 2014

= Raorchestes echinatus =

Species of frog

The spiny bush frog (Roarchestes echinatus) is a species of frog in the family Rhacophoridae. It is endemic to India. It has been observed in the Western Ghat mountains, between 1464 and 1864 meters above sea level.

This frog has been observed in grassy places.

Scientists classify this frog as vulnerable to extinction because, although locally abundant, it has been found in only one place. If climate change should alter that habitat, the frog would become critically endangered immediately. The frog's habitat is a pilgrimage site.

== Original description ==
- Vijayakumar SP; Dinesh KP; Prabhu MV; Shanker K (2014). "Lineage delimitation and description of nine new species of bush frogs (Anura: Raochestes, Rhacophoridae) from the Western Ghats escarpment". Zootaxa. 3893: 451–488.
