= Raorchestes huanglianshan =

Scientific classification
- Kingdom: Animalia
- Phylum: Chordata
- Class: Amphibia
- Order: Anura
- Family: Rhacophoridae
- Genus: Raorchestes
- Species: R. huanglianshan

Binomial name
- Raorchestes huanglianshan Jiang, Wang, Ren, and Li, 2020

Species of frog

Raorchestes huanglianshan, the Huanglianshan bush frog or Huanglianshan shrub frog, is a species of frog in the family Rhacophoridae. It is endemic to China and Thailand. Scientists have observed it on Mt. Huanglian, between 1600 and 1900 meters above sea level.

The adult male frog measures about 17.0–19.6 mm in snout-vent length and one adult female frog is 21.5 mm. The skin of dorsum is brown-gray in color with orange marks on the top of the head and an X-shaped dark brown mark on the back. There are three brown spots under each eye. This frog has bright orange climbing disks on its toes. The ventrum gray-white in color.

Scientists named this frog for Mt. Huanglian.
