= Raorchestes hillisi =

Scientific classification
- Kingdom: Animalia
- Phylum: Chordata
- Class: Amphibia
- Order: Anura
- Family: Rhacophoridae
- Genus: Raorchestes
- Species: R. hillisi

Binomial name
- Raorchestes hillisi Jiang, Wang, Ren, and Li, 2020

Species of frog

Raorchestes hillisi is a species of frog in the family Rhacophoridae. It is endemic to China. Scientists have observed it 1719 meters above sea level.

The adult male frog measures about 16.6–21.6 mm in snout-vent length and the adult female frog about 18.9–20.5 mm. The skin of the frog's back is brown with a darker triangular intraorbital mark. There are some yellow spots on top of the head. Some frogs have small white warts as well. Some frogs have a light line on the top of the body. The belly is white-gray in color.

Scientists named this frog after herpetologist David M. Hillis of the University of Texas.
