= Raorchestes sahai =

Sahai bushfrog

Conservation status
- Data Deficient (IUCN 3.1)

Scientific classification
- Kingdom: Animalia
- Phylum: Chordata
- Class: Amphibia
- Order: Anura
- Family: Rhacophoridae
- Genus: Raorchestes
- Species: R. sahai

Binomial name
- Raorchestes sahai (Sarkar & Ray, 2006)

Synonyms
- Philautus sahai Sarkar and Ray, 2006; Pseudophilautus sahai (Sarkar and Ray, 2006)

Species of amphibian

Raorchestes sahai, sometimes known as the Sahai bushfrog or Sahai bush frog, is a frog found by the Noa Dihing river near Gandhigram in Changlang district, Arunachal Pradesh, India.

This frog has been observed between 600 and 1200 meters above sea level, in dense forest near the Noa Dihing River. This frog was found inside a hollow in a tree containing rainwater and dead leaves. The frogs have also been seen perched grass in a swamp.

Scientists think this frog breeds through direct development with no free-swimming tadpole stage, like other frogs in Raorchestes.

Scientists believe this might be the same species as R. parvulus, but further data collection is warranted to confirm this.

== Original description ==
- Sarkar; Ray (2006). "Fauna of Arunachal Pradesh (Part-1)". Zoological Survey of India Calcutta. 303.
