= Raorchestes cangyuanensis =

Scientific classification
- Kingdom: Animalia
- Phylum: Chordata
- Class: Amphibia
- Order: Anura
- Family: Rhacophoridae
- Genus: Raorchestes
- Species: R. cangyuanensis

Binomial name
- Raorchestes cangyuanensis Wu, Suwannapoom, Xu, Murphy, and Che, 2019
- Type locality of Raorchestes cangyuanensis, Cangyuan County in Yunnan, China. Later records have extended its range westward to NE India and Bangladesh.

Species of frog

Raorchestes cangyuanensis is a species of frog in the family Rhacophoridae. It is known from its type locality in the eponymous Cangyuan County in southwest Yunnan, China, as well as from Mizoram in northeastern India and Satchari National Park in Bangladesh; its range presumably includes the intervening Myanmar.

== Description ==
The type series consists of three adult males that measure 16–20 mm (0.6–0.8 in) in snout–vent length, the largest one being the holotype; no females are known. The tympanum is indistinct while the supratympanic fold is distinct. The fingers have no webbing while the toes have rudimentary webbing; both fingers and toes have lateral dermal fringes and terminal discs. The dorsum is brown with a dark ")("-like marking. There is a golden brown band and a dark brown interorbital triangle between the eyes. The lips have white and black dots. The supratympanic fold is dark brown. The iris is golden brown. The limbs have dark brown crossbars dorsally. The ventral surfaces of the body and the limbs are brown with small black and white spots. The finger and toe discs are orange. Males have a single subgular vocal sac.

== Habitat and conservation ==
The type series was collected from shrubbery near streams at an elevation of 1,272 m (4,173 ft) above sea level. As of mid-2021, this species has not been assessed for the IUCN Red List of Threatened Species.
