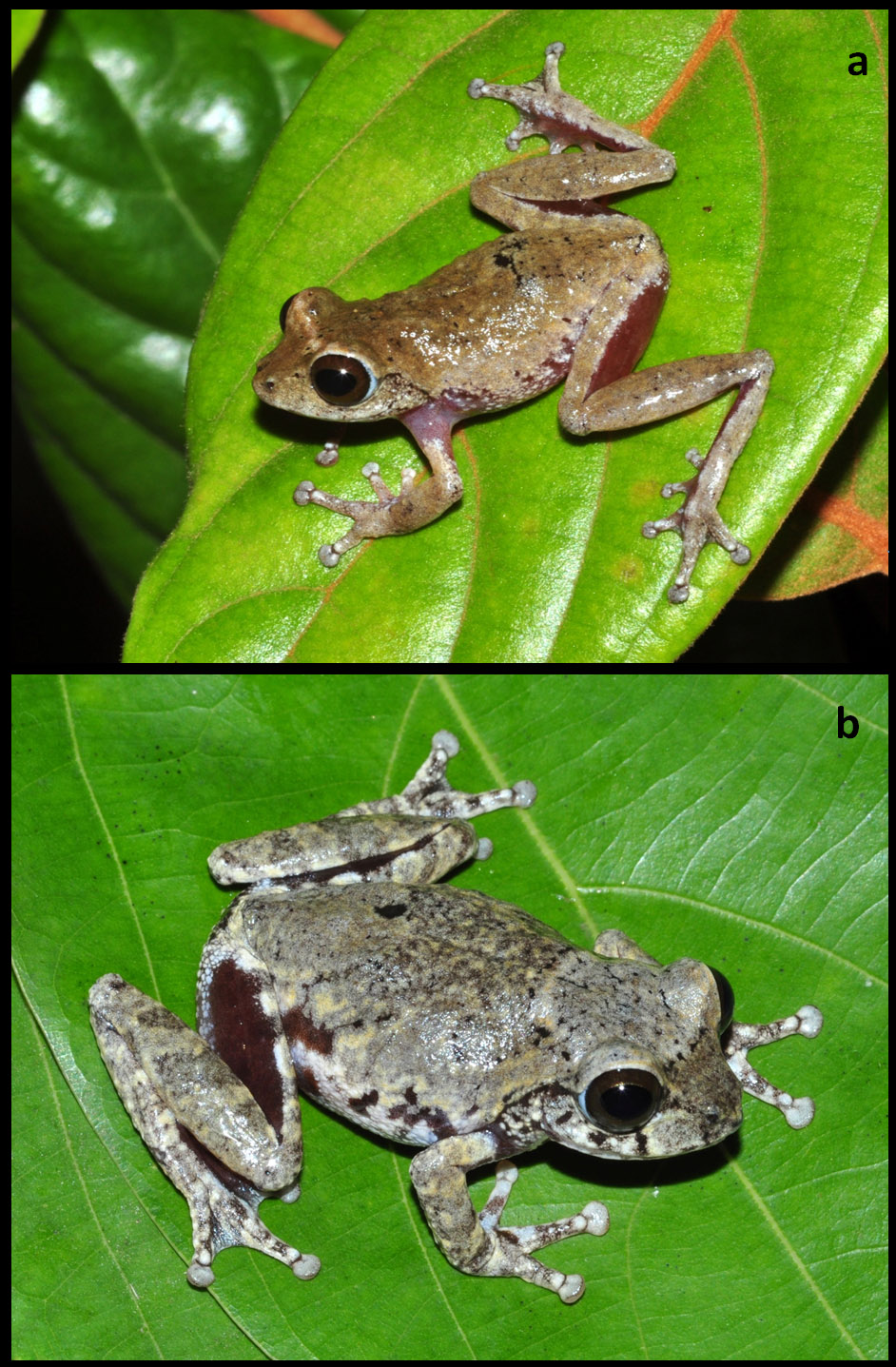
- Holotype male (a) and Paratype female (b)

Conservation status
- Near Threatened (IUCN 3.1)

Scientific classification
- Kingdom: Animalia
- Phylum: Chordata
- Class: Amphibia
- Order: Anura
- Family: Rhacophoridae
- Genus: Raorchestes
- Species: R. kakachi

Binomial name
- Raorchestes kakachi Seshadri, Gururaja, and Aravind, 2012

= Raorchestes kakachi =

Species of amphibian

Raorchestes kakachi (Kakachi shrub frog) is a species of frogs in the family Rhacophoridae. It is endemic to the southern Western Ghats of India. The specific name kakachi refers to the type locality from where the species was described.

== Description ==
It is a small sized frog with males ranging from 24.7 to 25.8 mm (based on three specimens) and females from 24.3 to 34.1 mm (based on three specimens). It is distinguished from all other congeners from the following suite of characters. Oval snout under dorsal view; indistinct tympanum; head wider than long and moderate webbing in hind feet. Dorsal coloration varies from brown to ivory; brownish mottling on flanks, ventral coloration ivory with brown blotches reducing towards vent and inner and outer surface of thigh, inner surface of shank and inner surface of tarsus with a distinct dark brown horizontal band which extends up to first three toes on upper surface.

=== Sexual dimorphism ===
Males lack nuptial pads. They possess a median subgular vocal sac with a pair of openings at the base of the lower jaw. The iris is dark brown. Females are larger than the male and possess a large ovary with creamy white eggs. Females have on their head a tetragonal cap like patch varying in color from pale pink to grey, iris colour reddish to golden brown (see the image: a = male;b = female).

== Distribution and ecology ==
This species was described from bushes near Kakachi in the Agastyamalai region in the southern Western Ghats. It has not been reported from elsewhere. It has been found in evergreen forests at elevations of 1100 to 1300 meters above sea level, exclusively in the protected Kalakad Mundanthurai Tiger Reserve and Shendurney, Peppara and Neyyar Wildlife Sanctuaries. It has been observed on the forest floor and on riparian vegetation. Individuals of this species are known to live in forest canopies. Vocalization usually begins early in the evening.

Like other frogs in Raorchestes, this frog breeds through direct development with no free-swimming tadpole stage.

== Threats ==
Scientists classify this frog as near-threatened because its population is entirely dependent on the diligent management of its protected habitats. Were the status of those areas to change, scientists believe it would be subject to considerable habitat degradation and fragmentation. Scientists also cite climate change as a threat to this frog. Because it lives at considerable elevation, it would not be able to migrate north should its habitat become too warm or dry.

Scientists have seen the fungus Batrachochytrium dendrobatidis on other frogs in Raorchestes, so they believe could infect R. kakachi too. Batrachochytrium dendrobatidis causes the fungal disease chytridiomycosis.
