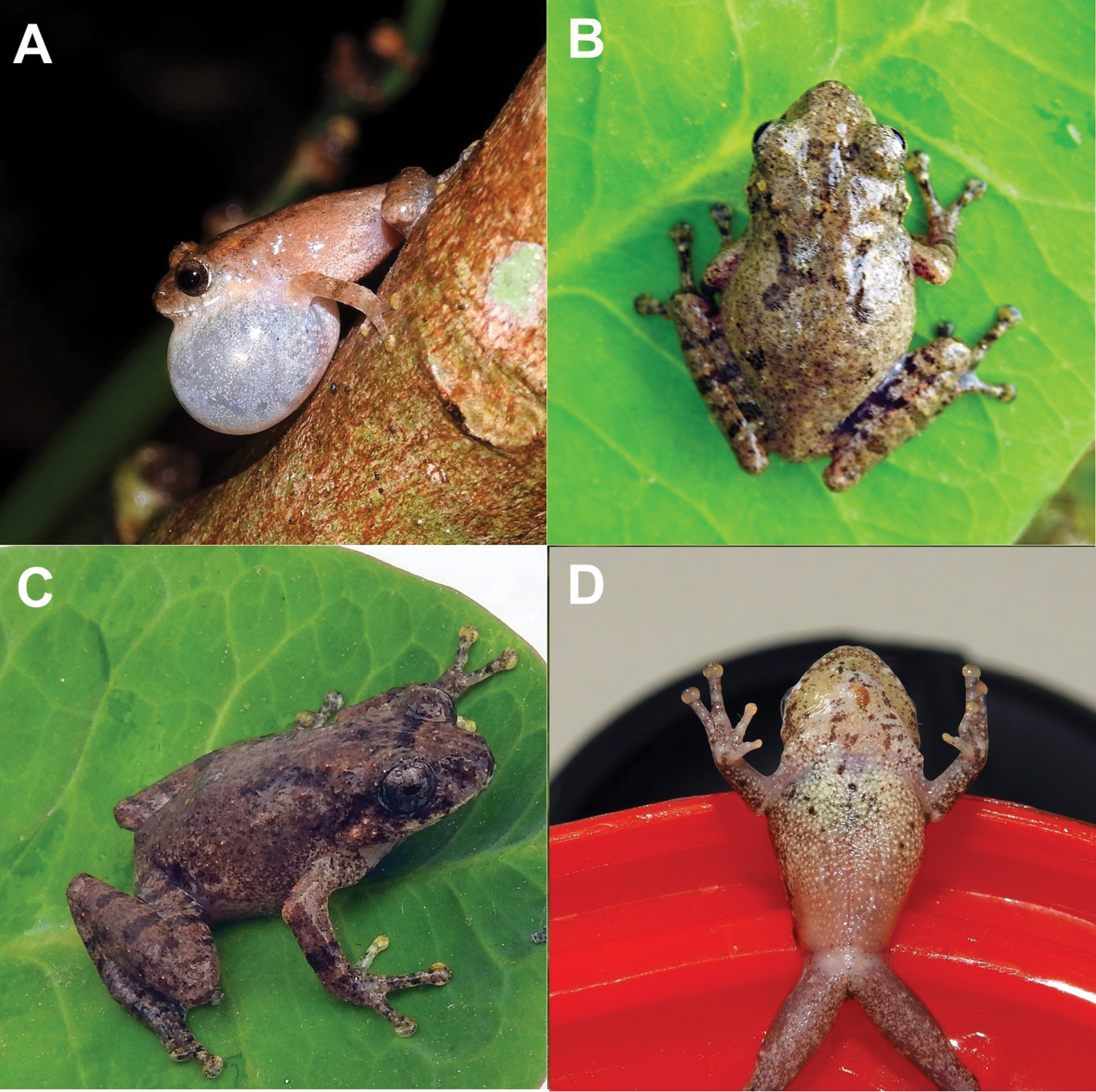

Conservation status
- Data Deficient (IUCN 3.1)

Scientific classification
- Kingdom: Animalia
- Phylum: Chordata
- Class: Amphibia
- Order: Anura
- Family: Rhacophoridae
- Genus: Raorchestes
- Species: R. rezakhani

Binomial name
- Raorchestes rezakhani Al-Razi, Maria, and Muzaffar, 2020

= Raorchestes rezakhani =

Species of frog

Raorchestes rezakhani is a species of cryptic bush frog (Anura, Rhacophoridae, Raorchestes) from northeastern Bangladesh. It has been observed in habitats containing evergreen trees.

== Appearance ==
The adult male frog measures 18.85–20.90 mm in snout-vent length. The skin of the dorsum is dark in color with small spikes and some spots. The snout is dark in color. The iris of the eye is brown in color. There are large disks on the toes for climbing. The disks can be red or white.

== Etymology and specimens ==
The frog was named after Mohammad Ali Reza Khan, a ornithologist and wildlife conservationist. The research, collection, and identification tasks were done by two Bangladeshi researchers (Hasan Al Razi Chayan and Marjan Maria) from Jagannath University, Dhaka with support from Sabir Bin Muzaffar, Professor of Biology at United Arab Emirates University. The specimens are deposited in the Shahid Rafique Special Specimen Collection, Department of Zoology, Jagannath University, Dhaka.
