= Raorchestes manipurensis =

Conservation status
- Data Deficient (IUCN 3.1)

Scientific classification
- Kingdom: Animalia
- Phylum: Chordata
- Class: Amphibia
- Order: Anura
- Family: Rhacophoridae
- Genus: Raorchestes
- Species: R. manipurensis

Binomial name
- Raorchestes manipurensis (Mathew and Sen, 2009)

Synonyms
- Philautus manipurensis Mathew and Sen, 2009; Pseudophilautus manipurensis Li, Che, Murphy, Zhao, Zhao, Rao, and Zhang, 2009

Species of amphibian

Raorchestes manipurensis or Leimatak's bush frog is a species of frog of the genus Raorchestes found around the Tumzane river near Leimatak, Churachandpur district in the state of Manipur in India. This frog has been observed between 636 and 685 meters above sea level.

Scientists found this frog in the dry place where a river had been. It was near bamboo. The frogs hid under small rocks and dry leaves. Scientists think this frog hatches out of its egg as a small frog, like other frogs in Raorchestes. The species was discovered in 2008 and is named after "Leimatek" in Manipur, its type locality.

== Original description ==
- Mathew R; Sen N. (2009). "Studies on little known amphibian species of northeast India". Rec. Zool. Surv. India Occ. Paper (Abstract). 293: 1–64.
