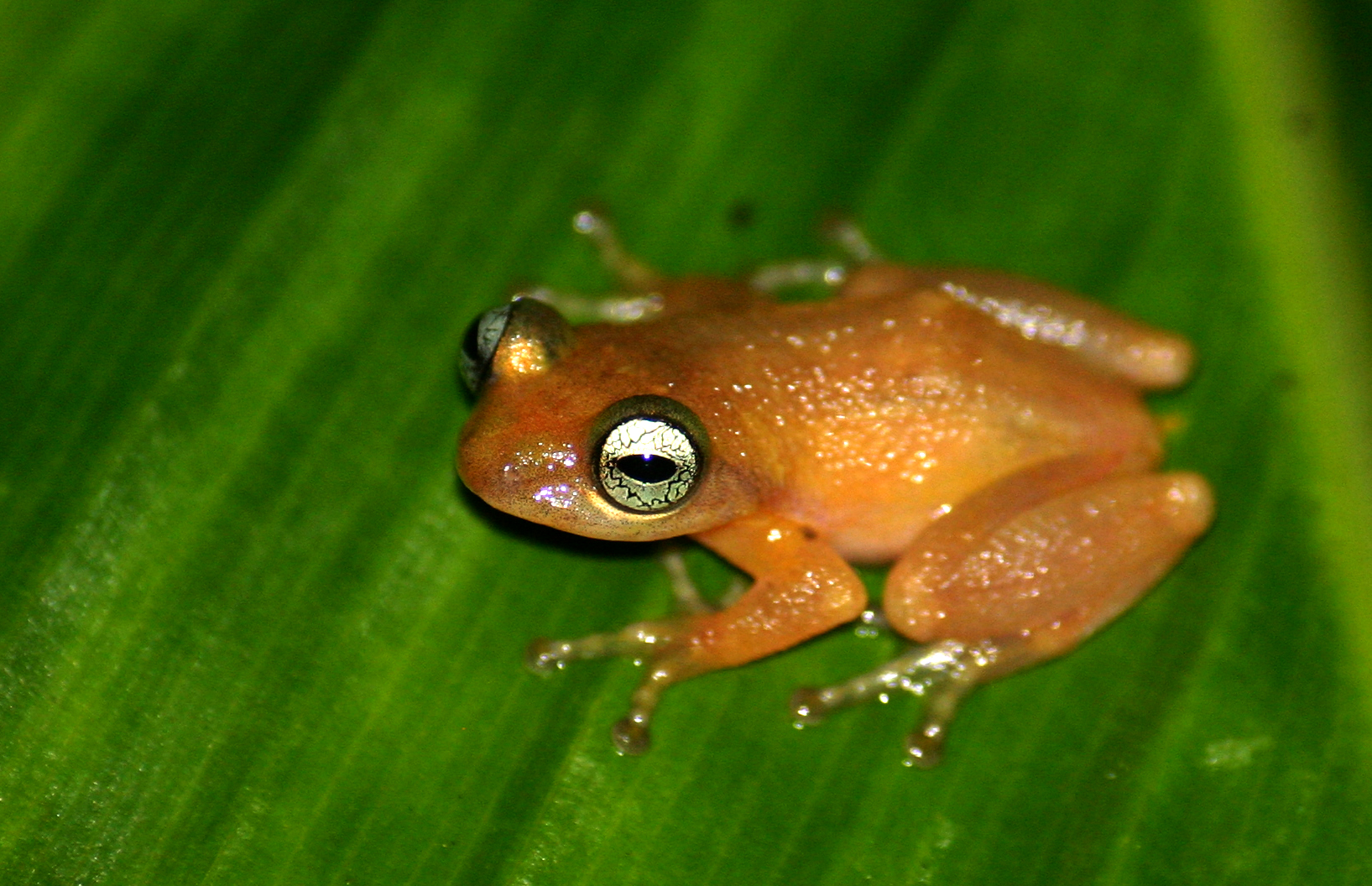

Conservation status
- Near Threatened (IUCN 3.1)

Scientific classification
- Kingdom: Animalia
- Phylum: Chordata
- Class: Amphibia
- Order: Anura
- Family: Rhacophoridae
- Genus: Raorchestes
- Species: R. uthamani

Binomial name
- Raorchestes uthamani Zachariah, Dinesh, Kunhikrishnan, Das, Raju, Radhakrishnan, Palot, and Kalesh, 2011

= Raorchestes uthamani =

Species of amphibian

Utham's tree frog (Raorchestes uthamani) is a species of frog of the genus Raorchestes found in Gavi, Pathanamthitta district, in the Western Ghats of Kerala in India. Scientists first observed it near a cardamom plantation in Gavi, 1000 meters above sea level. The species is named after two naturalists, bird photographer, P.K. Uthaman, and Deputy Conservator of Forests, K.V. Uthaman.

This frog has since been observed among bamboo plants in evergreen forests and on other cardamom plantations, all between 900 and 1100 meters above sea level.

The female frog lays her eggs in bamboo plants.

The IUCN classifies this frog as near threatened because its limited range contains two protected parks, Periyar Tiger Reserve and Anamalai Tiger Reserve. If the frog were to be found in other places or if the treatment of the parks changed, it would be uplisted "immediately." The frog may also be in some danger from the subsistence harvesting of bamboo from its habitat.

Scientists believe the fungus Batrachochytrium dendrobatidis may infect this frog. Batrachochytrium dendrobatidis causes the fungal disease chytridiomycosis.

== Original description ==
- Zachariah A; Dinesh KP; Kunhikrishnan E; Das S; Raju DV; Radhakrishnan C; Palot MJ; Kalesh S (2011). "Nine new species of frogs of the genus Raorchestes (Amphibia: Anura: Rhacophoridae) from southern Western Ghats, India". Biosystematica (Excerpt). 5 (1): 25–48.
