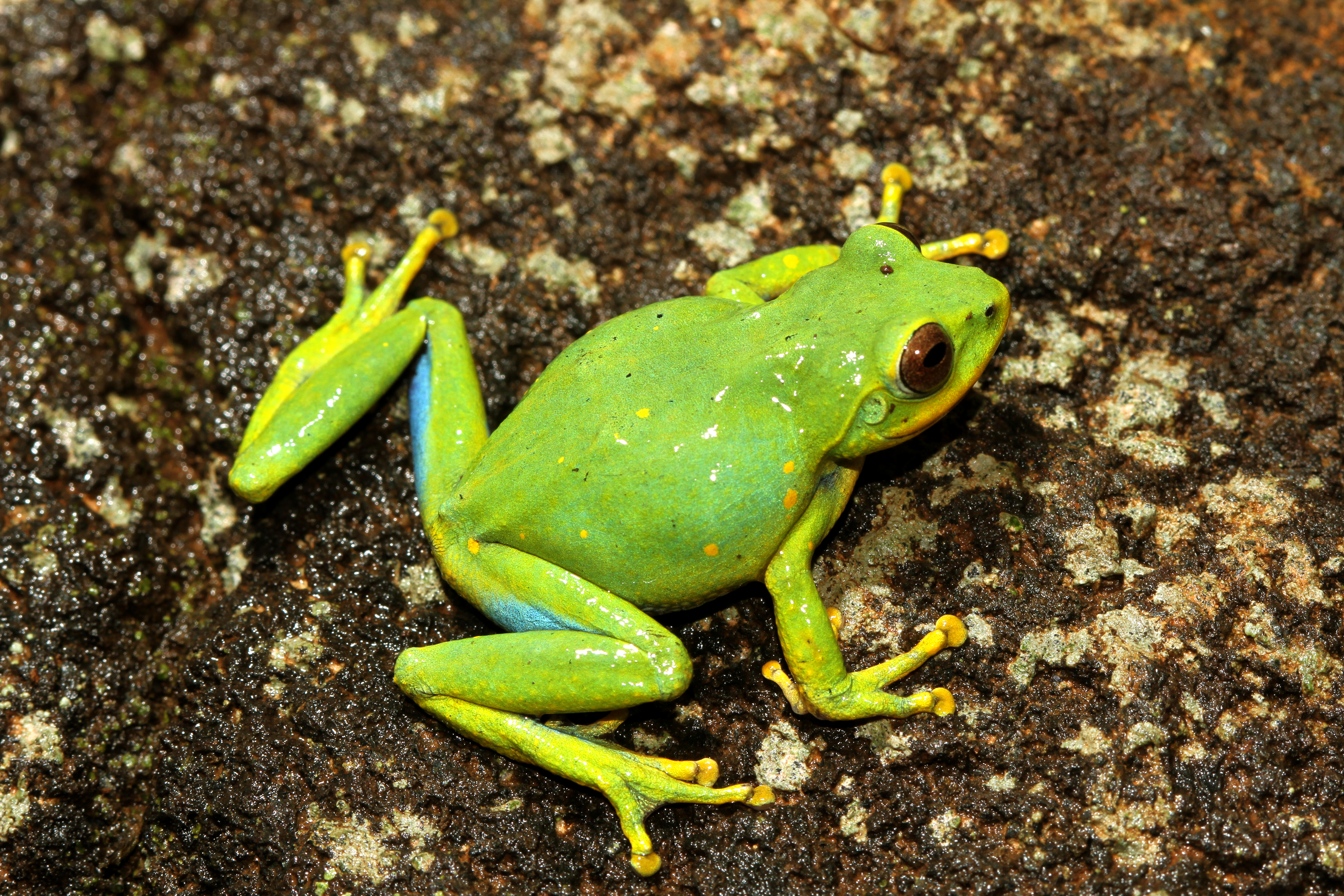

Conservation status
- Vulnerable (IUCN 3.1)

Scientific classification
- Kingdom: Animalia
- Phylum: Chordata
- Class: Amphibia
- Order: Anura
- Family: Rhacophoridae
- Genus: Raorchestes
- Species: R. indigo

Binomial name
- Raorchestes indigo Vijayakumar, Dinesh, Prabhu, and Shanker, 2014

= Raorchestes indigo =

Species of frog

Roarchestes indigo is a species of frog in the family Rhacophoridae. It is endemic to India. It has been observed high in the mountains in scrub tree habitats. This frog has been observed between 1400 and 1700 meters above sea level.

This frog lives on the forest floor among the leaf litter. It has not been observed in grasslands. Scientists believe, but have not confirmed, that this frog breeds through direct development, like other frogs in Raorchestes.

Scientists classify this frog as vulnerable to extinction because it has only been seen in one place: Kudremukh National Park. They also cite climate change as a threat, given that it could make the frog's habitat too dry.

Scientists believe the fungus Batrachochytrium dendrobatidis could kill this frog through the disease chytridiomycosis.

== Original publication ==
- Vijayakumar SP; Dinesh KP; Prabhu MV; Shanker K (2014). "Lineage delimitation and description of nine new species of bush frogs (Anura: Raochestes, Rhacophoridae) from the Western Ghats escarpment". Zootaxa. 3893: 451–488.
