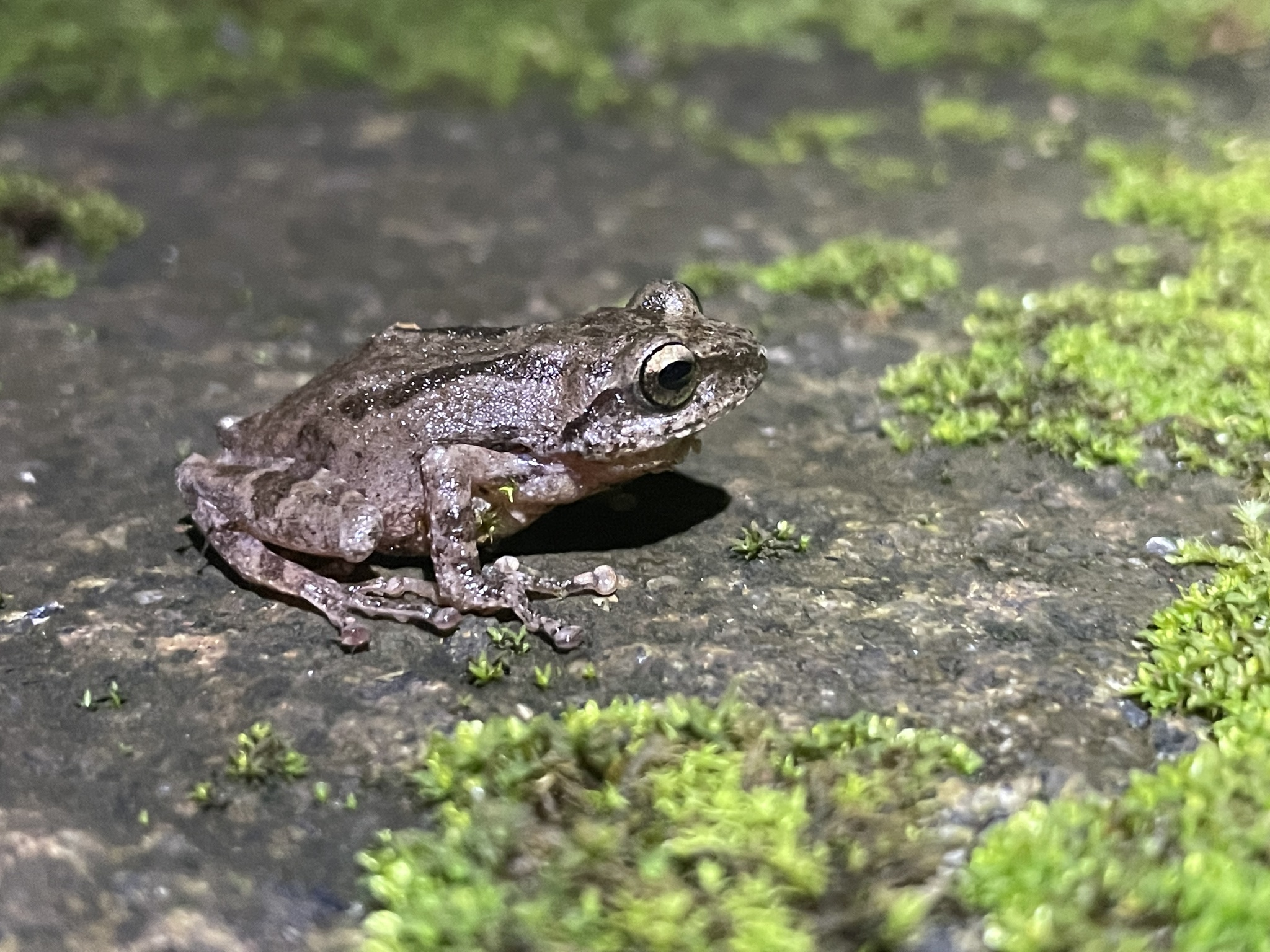

Scientific classification
- Kingdom: Animalia
- Phylum: Chordata
- Class: Amphibia
- Order: Anura
- Family: Rhacophoridae
- Genus: Raorchestes
- Species: R. kollimalai

Binomial name
- Raorchestes kollimalai Gowande, Ganesh, and Mirza, 2020

= Raorchestes kollimalai =

Species of frog

Raorchestes kollimalai, the Kollimalai bush frog, is a species of frog in the family Rhacophoridae. It is endemic to India. Scientists have observed it its type locality in the Western Ghat mountains, about 1100 meters above sea level.

The adult male frog measures 15–45 mm long in snout-vent length. The skin of the dorsum is light brown with darker brown spots and marks. There is a dark brown stripe on each side of its head. The stripe goes from the eye over the ear to the frog's shoulder. The pupil of the eye is black in color with gold in it.

Scientists named this frog Kollimalai for its type locality.
