= Raorchestes gryllus =

Conservation status
- Vulnerable (IUCN 3.1)

Scientific classification
- Kingdom: Animalia
- Phylum: Chordata
- Class: Amphibia
- Order: Anura
- Family: Rhacophoridae
- Genus: Raorchestes
- Species: R. gryllus

Binomial name
- Raorchestes gryllus (Smith, 1924)

Synonyms
- Philautus gryllus Smith, 1924

Species of frog

Raorchestes gryllus, the Langbian bubble-nest frog or Langbian frilled tree frog is a species of frog in the family Rhacophoridae. It is found in Laos and Vietnam. It has been observed between 880 and 2027 meters above sea level.

This frog lives in montaine forests. It lays eggs in moist areas under logs and on tree roots. The frog breeds by direct development with no free-swimming tadpole stage.

Scientists classify this frog as vulnerable to extinction because its range is still subject to considerable degradation. That range includes some protected parks: Bidoup-Nui Ba National Park, Phuoc Binh National Park, and Ta Dung Nature Reserve. Its natural habitat is shrubby vegetation.
