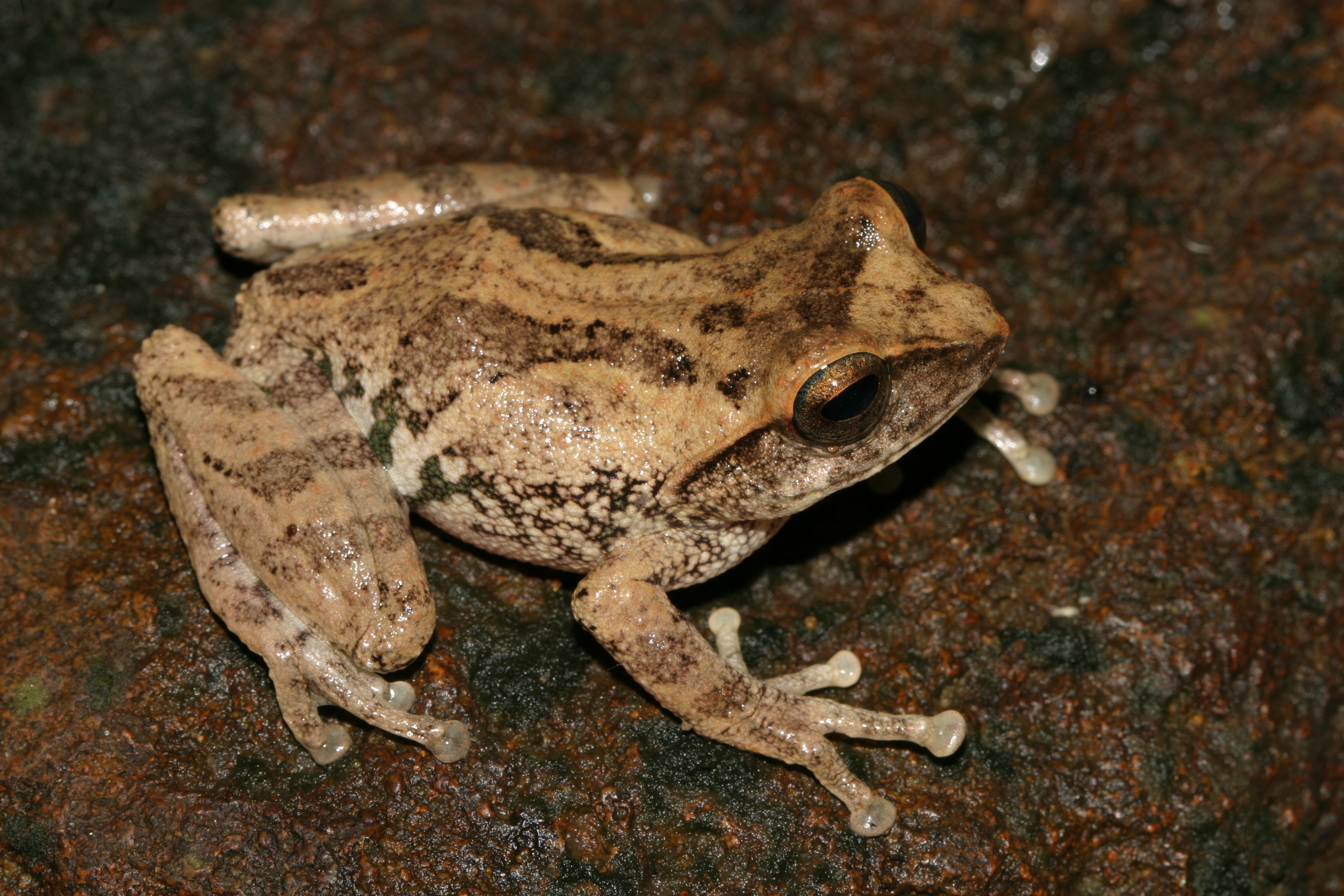

Conservation status
- Endangered (IUCN 3.1)

Scientific classification
- Kingdom: Animalia
- Phylum: Chordata
- Class: Amphibia
- Order: Anura
- Family: Rhacophoridae
- Genus: Raorchestes
- Species: R. johnceei

Binomial name
- Raorchestes johnceei Zachariah, Dinesh, Kunhikrishnan, Das, Raju, Radhakrishnan, Palot, and Kalesh, 2011

= Raorchestes johnceei =

Species of amphibian

Raorchestes johnceei is a species of frog of the genus Raorchestes found in Bonacaud in the Western Ghats of Kerala, India. It has been observed between 900 and 1300 meters above sea level.

== Nomenclature ==
The species is named after Professor John C. Jacob (popularly known as "Johncee").

== Habitat and threats ==
This frog has been observed perching on highland reed plants, including Ochlandra travancorica. This frog breeds in bamboo plants through direct development.

Scientists classify this frog as endangered because of its small range. Humans harvest the reeds that the frog needs to survive for use as fence-building material and to deter elephants. The frog is often a bycatch of bamboo harvesting. Scientists also cite climate change as a threat because this species, like other high-elevation populations, cannot readily migrate to cooler habitats. Scientists have observed the fungus Batrachochytrium dendrobatidis on other frogs in Raorchestes, so they believe it could infect R. jayarami too. Batrachochytrium dendrobatidis causes the fungal disease chytridiomycosis.
