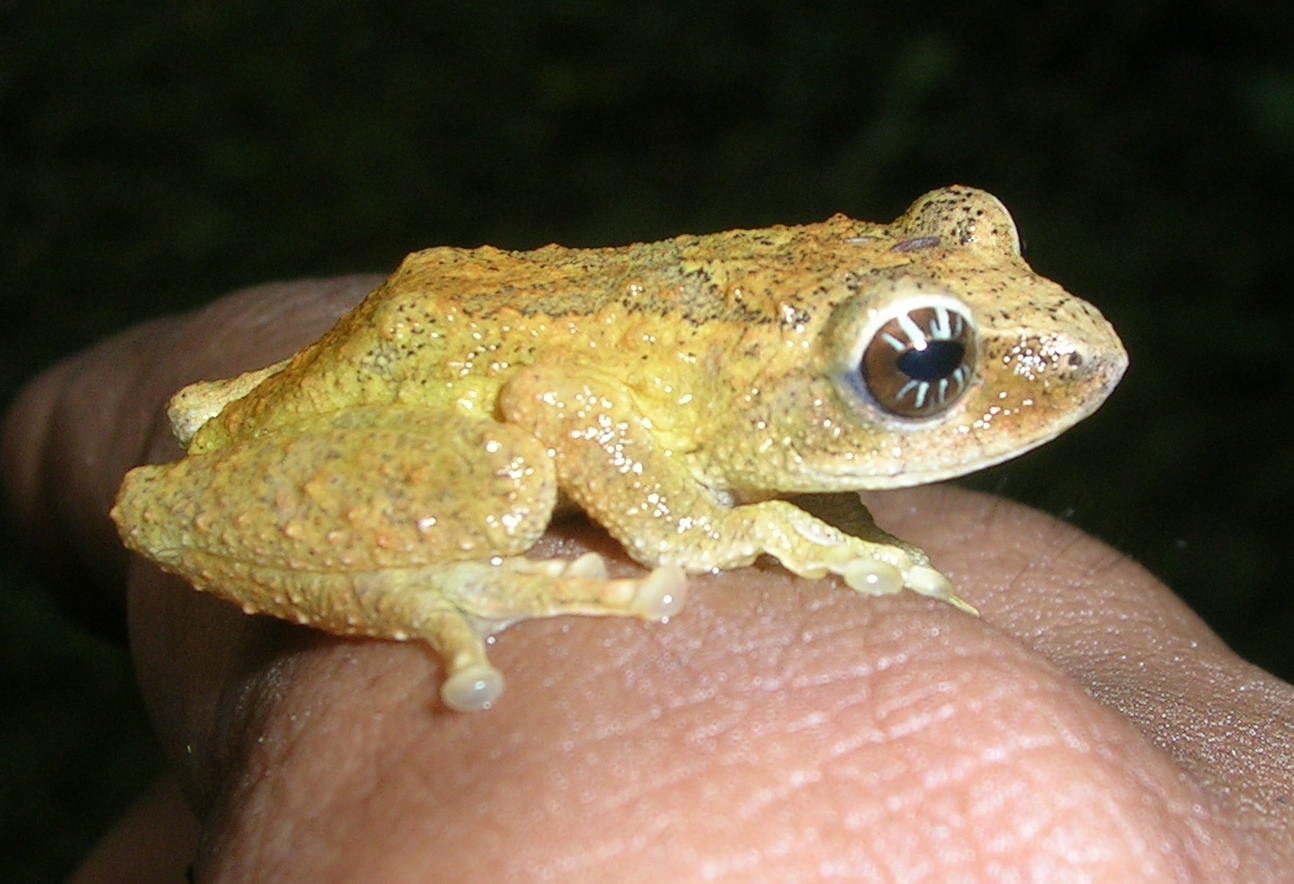
- Raorchestes signatus

Scientific classification
- Kingdom: Animalia
- Phylum: Chordata
- Class: Amphibia
- Order: Anura
- Family: Rhacophoridae
- Subfamily: Rhacophorinae
- Genus: Raorchestes; Biju, Shouche, Dubois, Dutta, and Bossuyt, 2010

Type species
- Ixalus glandulosus Jerdon, 1854

Diversity
- See text

= Raorchestes =

Genus of amphibians

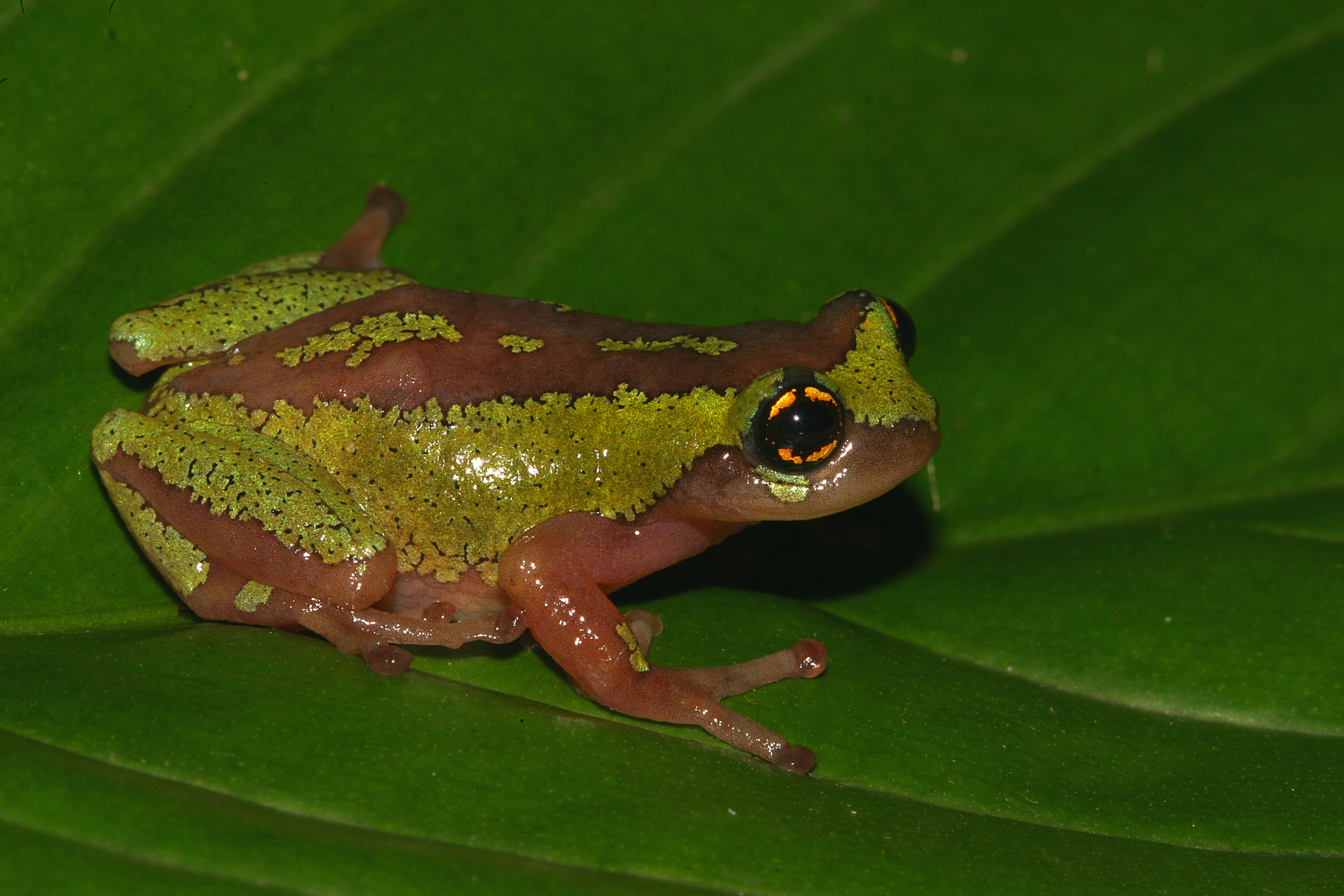
Raorchestes flaviocularis in India

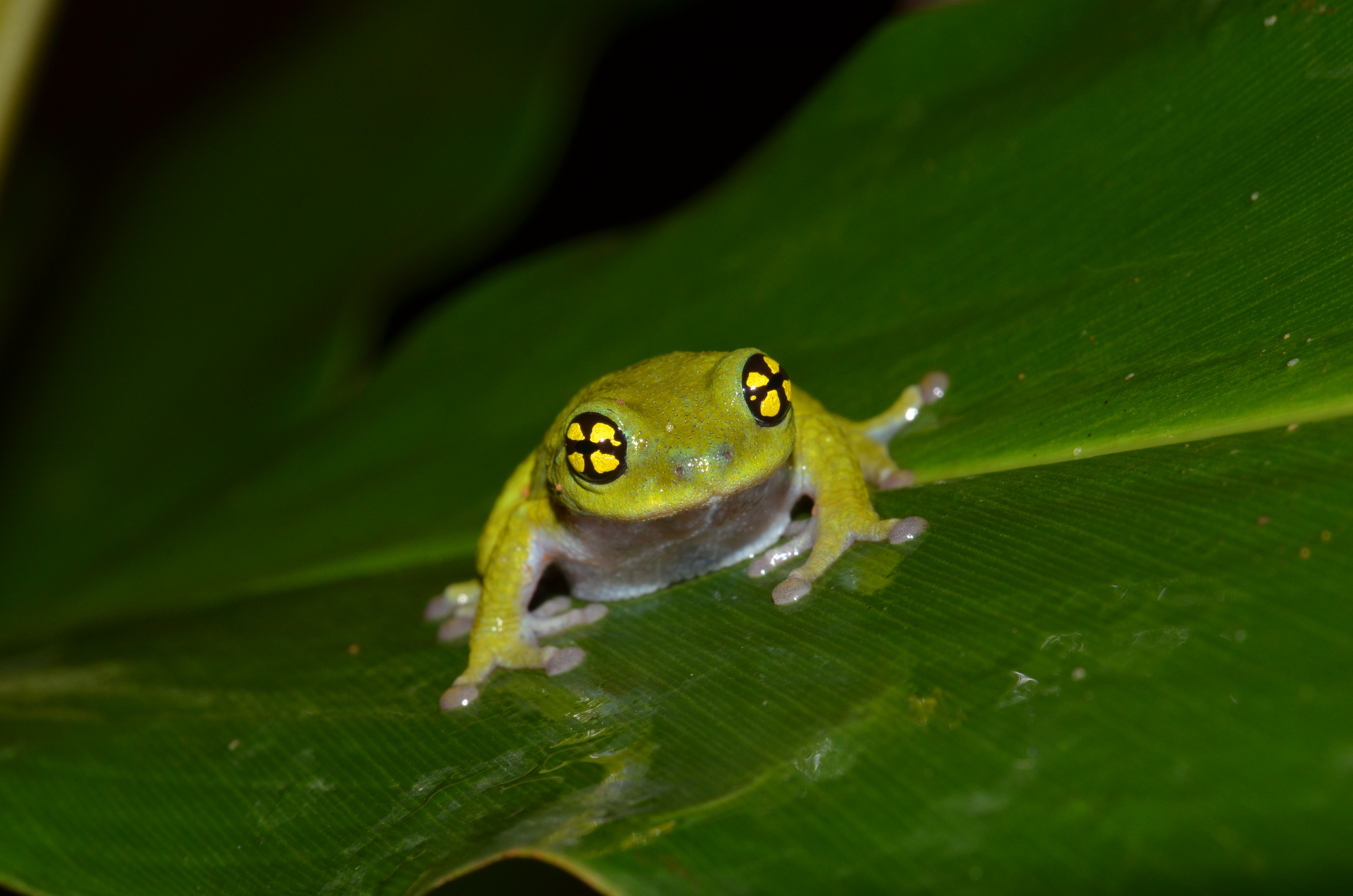
Raorchestes chalazodes from the Western Ghats.

Raorchestes is a genus of frogs in the subfamily Rhacophorinae that are found in mountainous regions of South Asia, Southeast Asia, and southern China. A recent study places Raorchestes as a sister taxon of Pseudophilautus. Before the description of the genus in 2010, species now in Raorchestes had been assigned to genera Ixalus (no longer recognized), Philautus, and Pseudophilautus.

The genus is named in honour of C. R. Narayan Rao in recognition of his contribution to Indian batrachology. The other root orchestes is based on an older genus name for frogs of the Philautus group, Orchestes Tschudi 1838. Extensive exploration in the range of the genus in the Western Ghats of India suggests an under-estimation of the number of species in the genus. A study of the diverse species of the genus show that the separate isolated massifs of the Western Ghats played a major role in the speciation and habitat specificity seen in the genus of bush frogs.

== Description ==
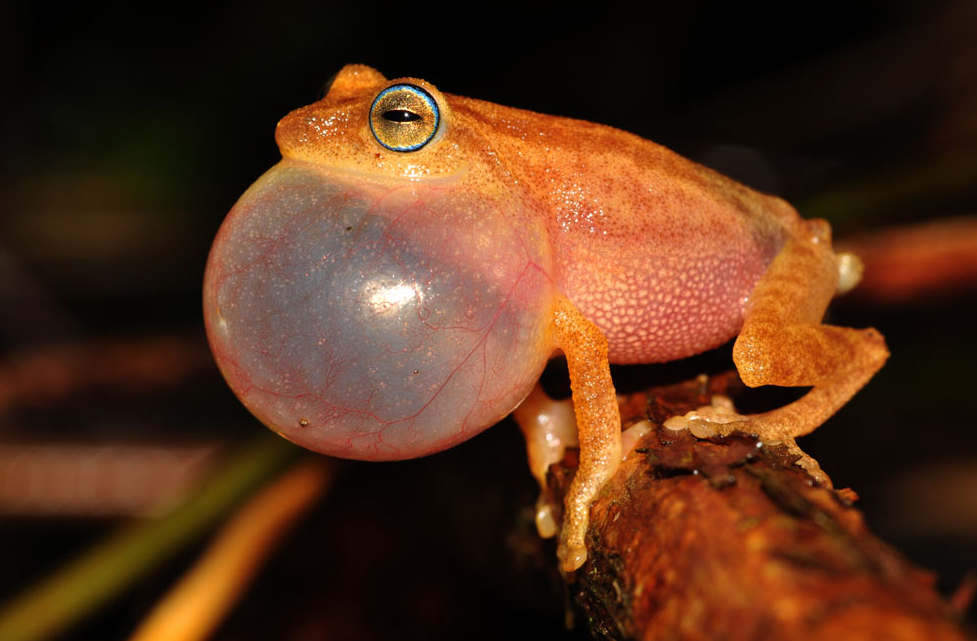
Male Raorchestes luteolus, with its eminent vocal sac

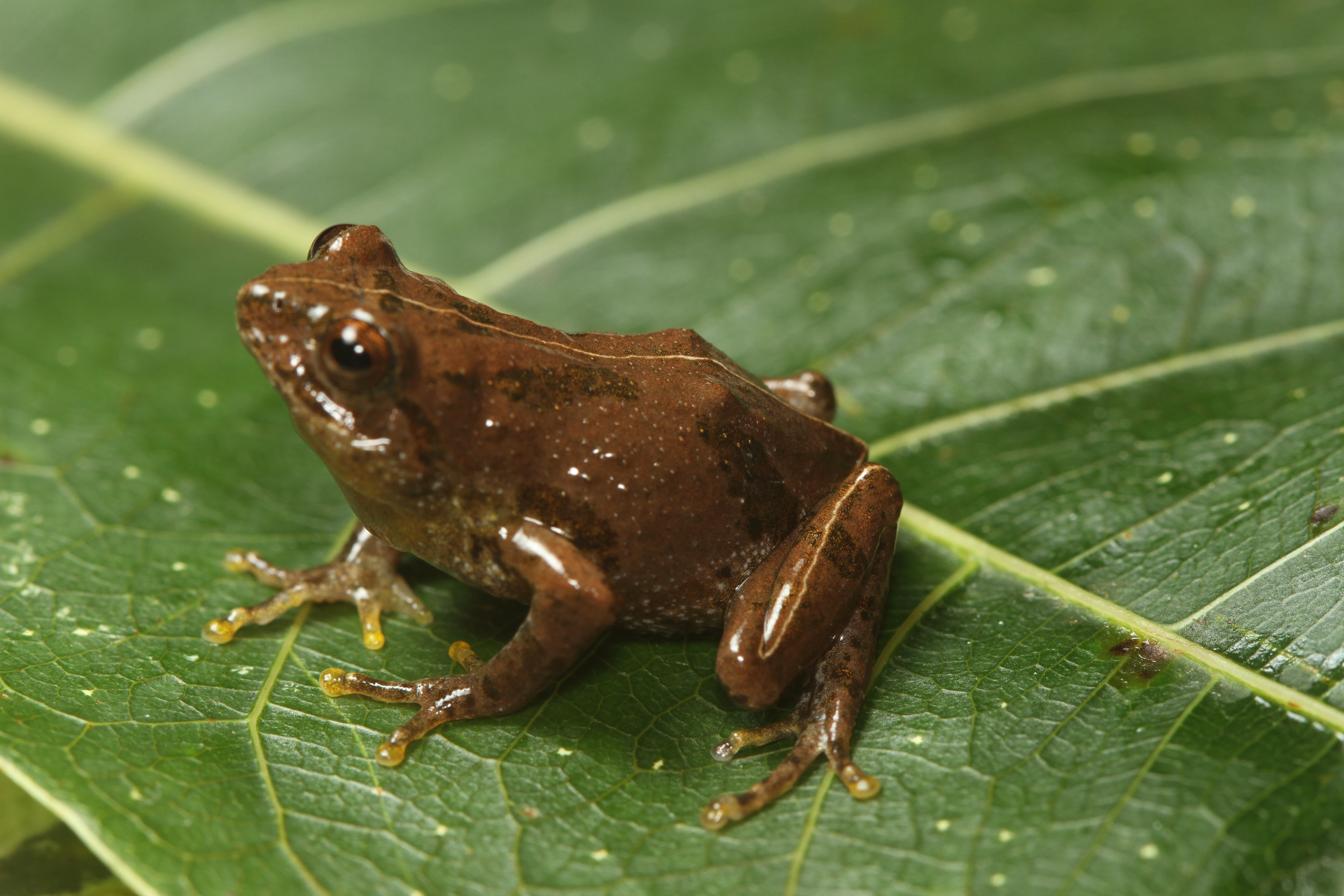
Raorchestes echinatus in India

Raorchestes are largely nocturnal, relatively small frogs with adult body size 15–45 mm (0.6–1.8 in) in snout-vent length. They lack vomerine teeth. Males have a large transparent vocal sac while calling. All described species of Raorchestes thus far, show direct development, that is, their life cycle does not involve a free-swimming tadpole stage. Their eggs hatch-out froglets skipping the tadpole stage making them less dependent on water. Raorchestes tinniens eggs took 36 days to hatch and temperature played a huge role in the development times. Different individuals of a species within this genus can be difficult to identify in the field because of color and pattern variations. Species of the genus Raorchestes also have different variations in their iris and pupil coloration. Difficulties in field identifications are leading to more integrative species description practices within the genus. These difficulties have also led to potential misidentification of species and ranges.

Frogs of the genus Raorchestes are known as bush frogs, and are known to use different arboreal niches. The exception being the short-limbed Raorchestes resplendens that is known to be ground-dwelling and was discovered on the highest peak of the Western Ghats called Anamudi.

== Distribution ==
One group is found in the mountain ranges of southern India (in the Western and Eastern Ghats) and another group ranges from northeastern India to Nepal, Myanmar, Thailand, and Laos to southern China and Vietnam and Peninsular Malaysia. They are most diverse in the Western Ghats of India; in contrast, only eight species from the genus have been reported from southeast Asia and China.

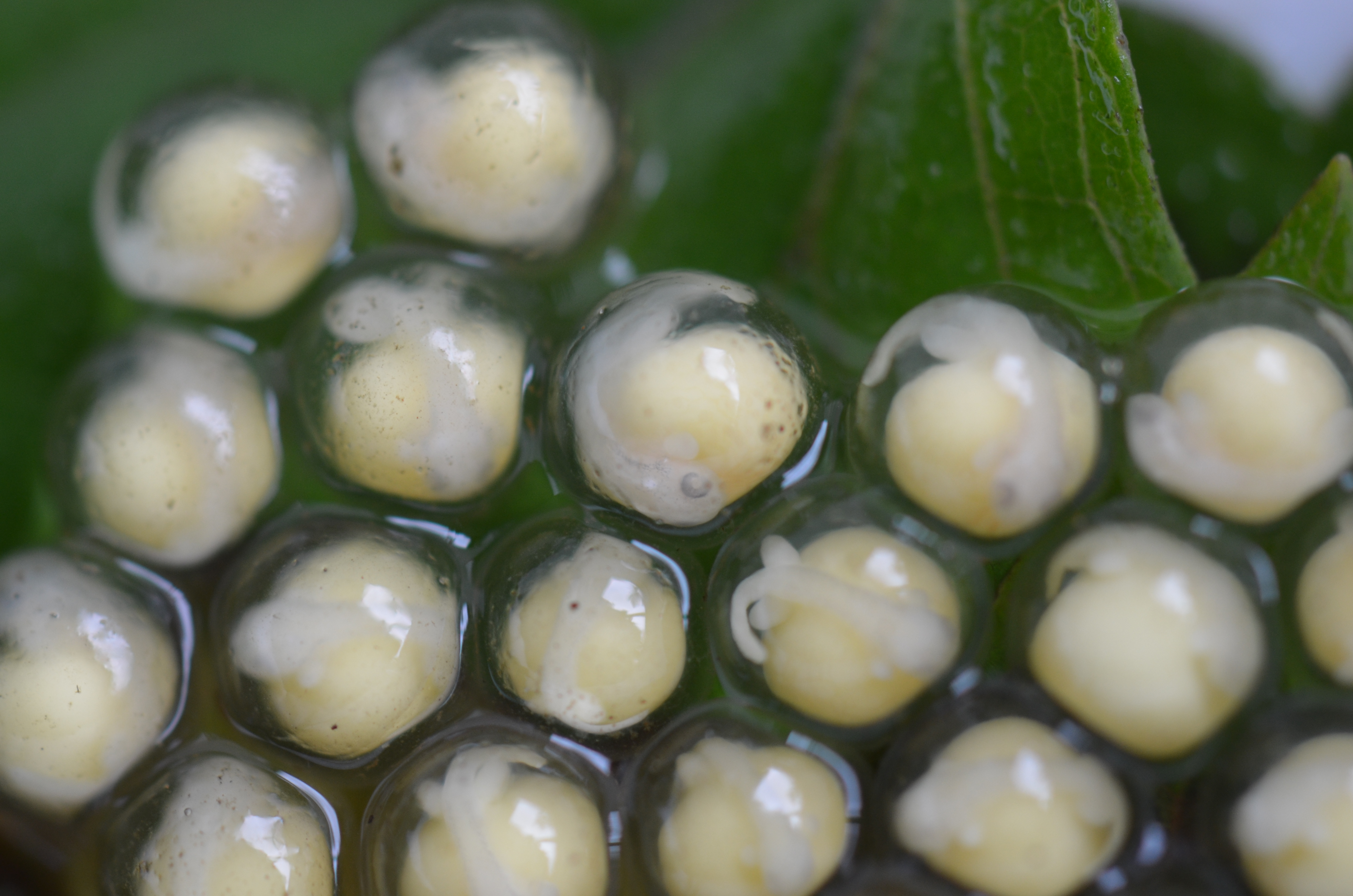
Direct developing eggs of Raorchestes jayarami.

== Conservation ==
IUCN has assessed 38 species of Raorchestes. Many species are Critically Endangered, and one species (Raorchestes travancoricus) was already considered extinct, only to be rediscovered in 2004. Of the 38, eight are data deficient and 23 are in the critically endangered, endangered, and vulnerable categories. The Amphibian Specialist Group's list of "lost frogs" (frogs not seen for decades) includes 10 Raorchestes species. Since several species of the genus have been described in the last 15 years conservation data is relatively poor as are detailed life-history studies. Several species of the genus are known to have very narrow distribution ranges and are tied to specific niches in the environment which makes it difficult to have blanket conservation policy for the genus.

Several species of Raorchestes have been reported in checklists generated from both protected areas, as well as, agro and plantation landscapes.

== Species ==
Many new species from India have been described since 2000. The following species are currently recognised in the genus Raorchestes:.

- Raorchestes agasthyaensis Zachariah et al., 2011
- Raorchestes akroparallagi (Biju and Bossuyt, 2009)
- Raorchestes andersoni (Ahl, 1927)
- Raorchestes anili (Biju and Bossuyt, 2006)
- Raorchestes annandalii (Boulenger, 1906)
- Raorchestes archeos Vijayakumar, Dinesh, Prabhu, and Shanker, 2014
- Raorchestes arunachalensis Boruah, Deepak & Das, 2025
- Raorchestes aureus Vijayakumar, Dinesh, Prabhu, and Shanker, 2014
- Raorchestes barakensis Boruah, Deepak & Das, 2025
- Raorchestes beddomii (Günther, 1876)
- Raorchestes blandus Vijayakumar, Dinesh, Prabhu, and Shanker, 2014
- Raorchestes bobingeri (Biju and Bossuyt, 2005)
- Raorchestes bombayensis (Annandale, 1919)
- Raorchestes boulengeri Boruah, Deepak & Das, 2025
- Raorchestes cangyuanensis Wu, Suwannapoom, Xu, Murphy, and Che, 2019
- Raorchestes chalazodes (Günther, 1876)
- Raorchestes charius (Rao, 1937)
- Raorchestes chlorosomma (Biju and Bossuyt, 2009)
- Raorchestes chotta (Biju and Bossuyt, 2009)
- Raorchestes chromasynchysi (Biju and Bossuyt, 2009)
- Raorchestes cinerascens Boruah, Deepak & Das, 2025
- Raorchestes coonoorensis (Biju and Bossuyt, 2009)
- Raorchestes crustai Zachariah et al., 2011
- Raorchestes dibangensis Boruah, Deepak & Das, 2025
- Raorchestes drutaahu Garg, Suyesh, Das, Bee and Biju, 2021
- Raorchestes dubois (Biju and Bossuyt, 2006)
- Raorchestes eaglenestensis Boruah, Deepak & Das, 2025
- Raorchestes echinatus Vijayakumar, Dinesh, Prabhu, and Shanker, 2014
- Raorchestes flaviocularis Vijayakumar, Dinesh, Prabhu, and Shanker, 2014
- Raorchestes flaviventris (Boulenger, 1882)
- Raorchestes ghatei Padhye, Sayyed, Jadhav, and Dahanukar, 2013
- Raorchestes glandulosus (Jerdon, 1854)
- Raorchestes graminirupes (Biju and Bossuyt, 2005)
- Raorchestes griet (Bossuyt, 2002)
- Raorchestes gryllus (Smith, 1924)
- Raorchestes hassanensis Dutta, 1985
- Raorchestes hillisi Jiang et al., 2020
- Raorchestes honnametti Gururaja, Priti, Roshmi, and Aravind, 2016
- Raorchestes huanglianshan Jiang et al., 2020
- Raorchestes indigo Vijayakumar, Dinesh, Prabhu, and Shanker, 2014
- Raorchestes jayarami (Biju and Bossuyt, 2009)
- Raorchestes johnceei Zachariah et al., 2011
- Raorchestes kadalarensis Zachariah et al., 2011
- Raorchestes kaikatti (Biju and Bossuyt, 2009)
- Raorchestes kakachi Seshadri, Gururaja, and Aravind, 2012
- Raorchestes kakkayamensis Garg, Suyesh, Das, Bee and Biju, 2021
- Raorchestes keirasabinae Garg, Suyesh, Das, Bee and Biju, 2021
- Raorchestes khonoma Boruah, Deepak & Das, 2025
- Raorchestes kollimalai Gowande, Ganesh, and Mirza, 2020
- Raorchestes lawngtlaiensis Boruah, Deepak & Das, 2025
- Raorchestes lechiya Zachariah et al., 2016
- Raorchestes leucolatus Vijayakumar, Dinesh, Prabhu, and Shanker, 2014
- Raorchestes longchuanensis (Yang and Li, 1978)
- Raorchestes luteolus (Kuramoto and Joshy, 2003)
- Raorchestes magnus Boruah, Deepak & Das, 2025
- Raorchestes manipurensis (Mathew and Sen, 2009)
- Raorchestes manohari Zachariah et al., 2011
- Raorchestes marki (Biju and Bossuyt, 2009)
- Raorchestes mawsynramensis Boruah, Deepak & Das, 2025
- Raorchestes menglaensis (Kou, 1990)
- Raorchestes monolithus Boruah, Deepak & Das, 2025
- Raorchestes munnarensis (Biju and Bossuyt, 2009)
- Raorchestes narpuhensis Boruah, Deepak & Das, 2025
- Raorchestes nasuta Boruah, Deepak & Das, 2025
- Raorchestes nerostagona (Biju and Bossuyt, 2005)
- Raorchestes ochlandrae (Gururaja et al., 2007)
- Raorchestes orientalis Boruah, Deepak & Das, 2025
- Raorchestes parvulus (Boulenger, 1893)
- Raorchestes ponmudi (Biju and Bossuyt, 2005)
- Raorchestes primarrumpfi Vijayakumar, Dinesh, Prabhu, and Shanker, 2014
- Raorchestes ravii Zachariah et al., 2011
- Raorchestes resplendens Biju, Shouche, Dubois, Dutta, and Bossuyt, 2010
- Raorchestes rezakhani Al-Razi, Maria, and Muzaffar, 2020
- Raorchestes sahai (Sarkar and Ray, 2006)
- Raorchestes sanctisilvaticus (Das and Chanda, 1997)
- Raorchestes sanjappai Garg, Suyesh, Das, Bee and Biju, 2021
- Raorchestes shillongensis (Pillai and Chanda, 1973)
- Raorchestes signatus (Boulenger, 1882)
- Raorchestes silentvalley Zachariah, Cyriac et al., 2016
- Raorchestes sushili (Biju and Bossuyt, 2009)
- Raorchestes theuerkaufi Zachariah et al., 2011
- Raorchestes thodai Zachariah et al., 2011
- Raorchestes tinniens (Jerdon, 1854)
- Raorchestes travancoricus (Boulenger, 1891)
- Raorchestes tuberohumerus (Kuramoto and Joshy, 2003)
- Raorchestes tytthus Boruah, Deepak & Das, 2025
- Raorchestes uthamani Zachariah et al., 2011
- Raorchestes vellikkannan Garg, Suyesh, Das, Bee and Biju, 2021
