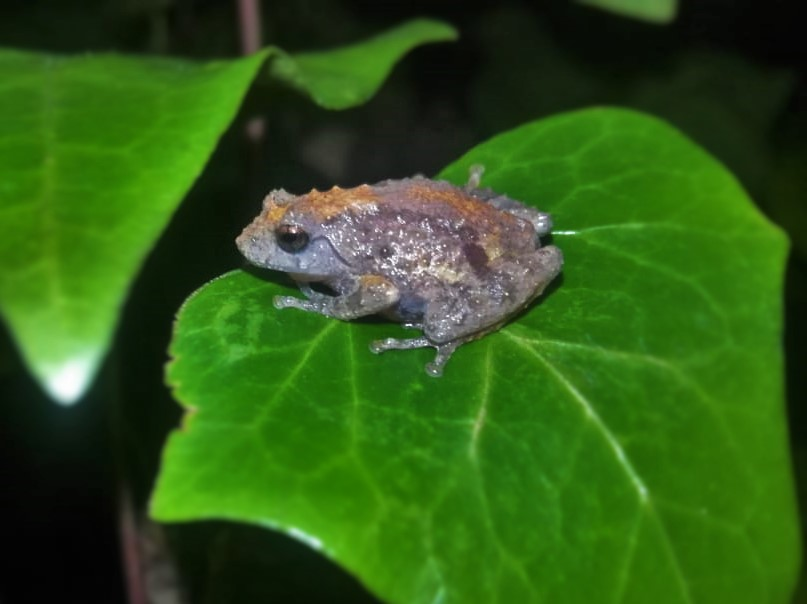

Conservation status
- Least Concern (IUCN 3.1)

Scientific classification
- Kingdom: Animalia
- Phylum: Chordata
- Class: Amphibia
- Order: Anura
- Family: Rhacophoridae
- Genus: Raorchestes
- Species: R. shillongensis

Binomial name
- Raorchestes shillongensis (Pillai & Chanda, 1973)
- Distribution of Raorchestes shillongensis

Synonyms
- Philautus shillongensis Pillai & Chanda, 1973

= Raorchestes shillongensis =

Species of frog

Raorchestes shillongensis (common names: Shillong bubble-nest frog, Shillong bush frog, Xmas frog) is a species of frog in the family Rhacophoridae. It is endemic to Greater Shillong in North East India. It is known from the Khasi Hills in the region of Shillong, Meghalaya in north-eastern India.

== Habitat and conservation ==
This frog is widespread in the Khasi Hills and has also been observed in other places, mostly between 1000 and 1600 meters above sea level. This frog perches on shrubs in forests, but it can also live near streams and even in human settlements. Like other frogs in Raorchestes, scientists believe it breeds through direct development with no free-swimming tadpole stage.

Scientists classify this frog as least concern of extinction because of its large range and its tolerance to habitat disturbance. What threats remain come from habitat loss, such as deforestation associated with logging and infrastructure. Scientists also cite climate change as a threat to this species. Because it lives at high elevations, it cannot simply migrate in search of new habitats.

== Documentary ==
Thumbelina - the story of an Xmas Frog by award-winning Indian wildlife filmmaker Ashwika Kapur is a documentary on Raorchestes shillongensis.
