= Raorchestes leucolatus =

Conservation status
- Data Deficient (IUCN 3.1)

Scientific classification
- Kingdom: Animalia
- Phylum: Chordata
- Class: Amphibia
- Order: Anura
- Family: Rhacophoridae
- Genus: Raorchestes
- Species: R. leucolatus

Binomial name
- Raorchestes leucolatus Vijayakumar, Dinesh, Prabhu, and Shanker, 2014

Species of frog

Roarchestes leucolatus is a species of frog in the family Rhacophoridae. It is endemic to India. Scientists have observed it in the Western Ghat mountains, between 894 and 958 meters above sea level.

This frog has been observed in the understory and on the ground in forests. Scientists believe this frog breeds through direct development, like other frogs in Raorchestes.

This frog may have faced some threat of extinction because of dam-building in its habitat, but the dam-building is not ongoing, and some of the forests are growing back. The frog's range includes some protected parkland.

Scientists have observed that the fungus Batrachochytrium dendrobatidis can infect other frogs in Raorchestes, so they think believe could infect R. jayarami as well. Batrachochytrium dendrobatidis causes the fungal disease chytridiomycosis.

== Original description ==
- Vijayakumar SP; Dinesh KP; Prabhu MV; Shanker K (2014). "Lineage delimitation and description of nine new species of bush frogs (Anura: Raochestes, Rhacophoridae) from the Western Ghats escarpment". Zootaxa. 3893: 451–488.
