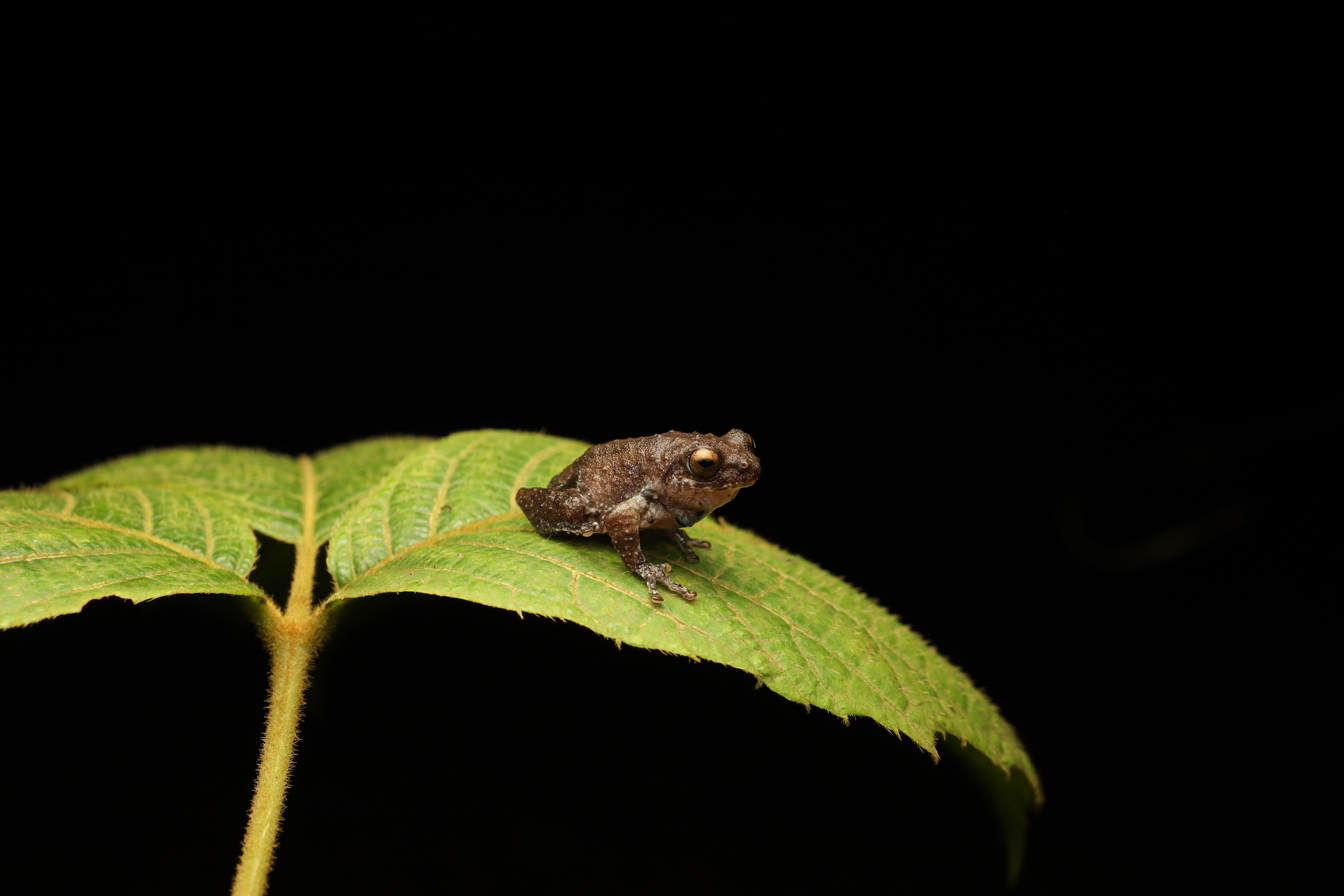

Conservation status
- Vulnerable (IUCN 3.1)

Scientific classification
- Kingdom: Animalia
- Phylum: Chordata
- Class: Amphibia
- Order: Anura
- Family: Rhacophoridae
- Genus: Raorchestes
- Species: R. bombayensis

Binomial name
- Raorchestes bombayensis (Annandale, 1919)
- Distribution of Raorchestes bombayensis

Synonyms
- Ixalus bombayensis Annandale, 1919; Philautus bombayensis (Annandale, 1919); Pseudophilautus bombayensis (Annandale, 1919)

= Raorchestes bombayensis =

Species of amphibian

Philautus bombayensis, the Bombay bubble-nest frog, Maharashtra bush frog, Castle Rock bush frog, or Konkan bush frog is a species of frogs in the family Rhacophoridae. It is endemic to the Western Ghats, India.

This arboreal frog has been found in the forest understorey, including some secondary forests, and in shrubland. It has been observed between 400 and 1300 meters above sea level. It is threatened by habitat loss associated with logging, building, and tourism.
