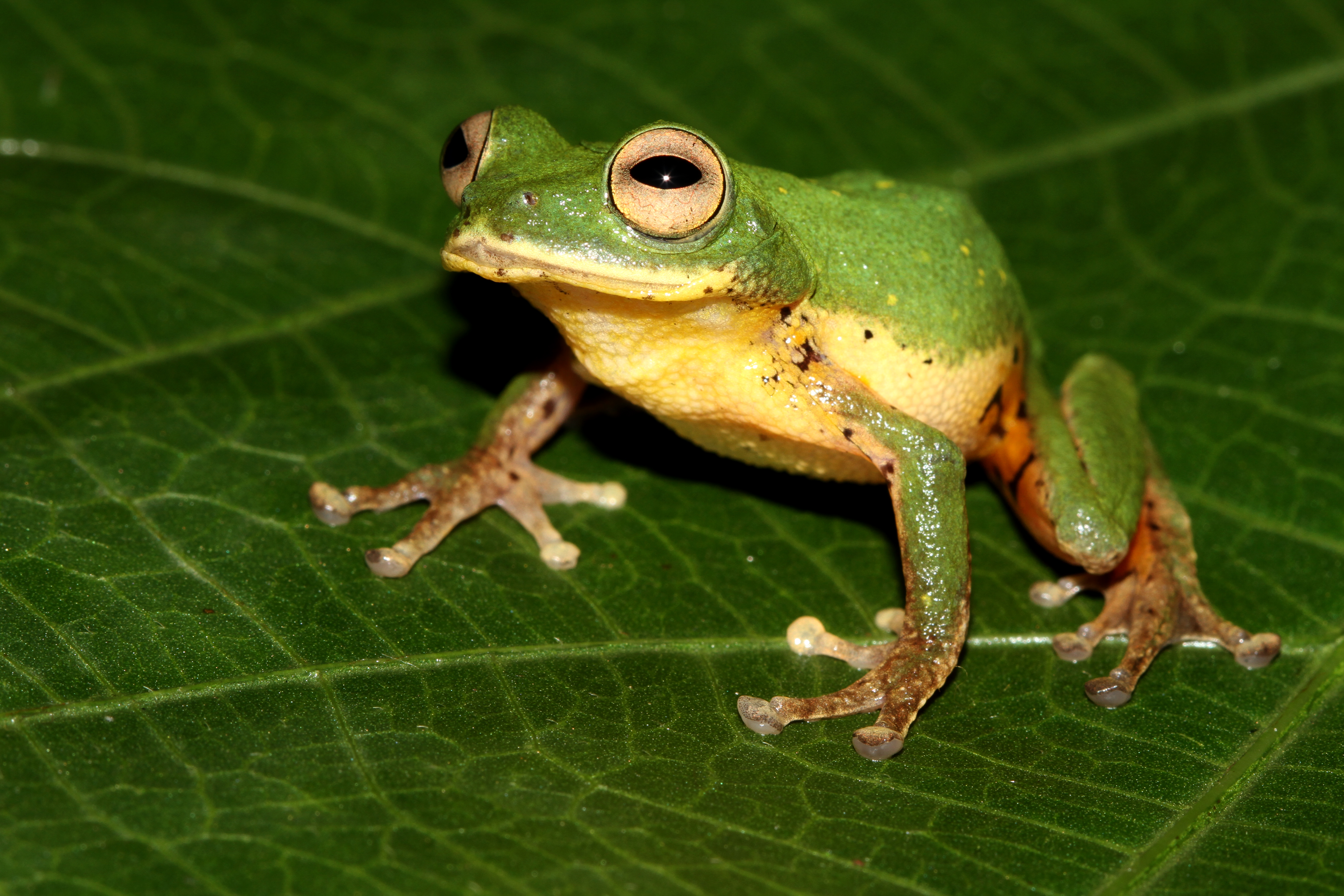

Conservation status
- Vulnerable (IUCN 3.1)

Scientific classification
- Kingdom: Animalia
- Phylum: Chordata
- Class: Amphibia
- Order: Anura
- Family: Rhacophoridae
- Genus: Raorchestes
- Species: R. flaviventris

Binomial name
- Raorchestes flaviventris (Boulenger, 1882)

Synonyms
- Ixalus flaviventris Boulenger, 1882; Philautus flaviventris (Boulenger, 1882); Pseudophilautus flaviventris (Boulenger, 1882); Raorchestes emeraldi Vijayakumar, Dinesh, Prabhu, and Shanker, 2014

= Raorchestes flaviventris =

Species of amphibian

Raorchestes flaviventris is a species of arboreal, nocturnal, frog of the family Rhacophoridae. It is endemic to the Western Ghats, South India. Its common names are yellow-bellied bush frog and Malabar bubble-nest frog.

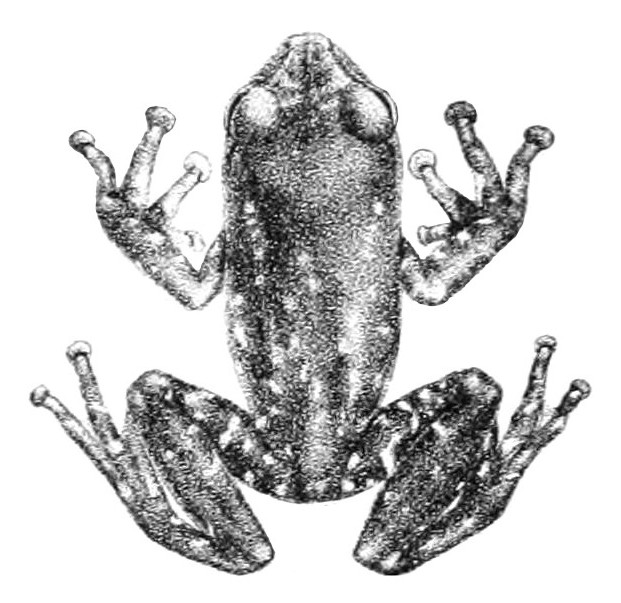
Illustration that accompanied the original species description of "Ixalus flaviventris" by George Albert Boulenger, published in the Catalogue of the Batrachia Salientia s. Ecaudata in the collection of the British Museum in 1882.

This frog has been observed between 1382 and 1900 meters above sea level, in wet evergreen forests and on cardamom plantations near such forests.

This frog breeds through direct development, hatching from its egg as a froglet with no free-swimming tadpole stage.

Scientists classify this frog as vulnerable to extinction because of its limited range, which is still subject to deforestation in favor of agriculture, especially small-scale agriculture. Its range also includes two protected parks: Eravikulam National Park and Anamalai Tiger Reserve Scientists believe there to be five or six populations of this frog remaining.
