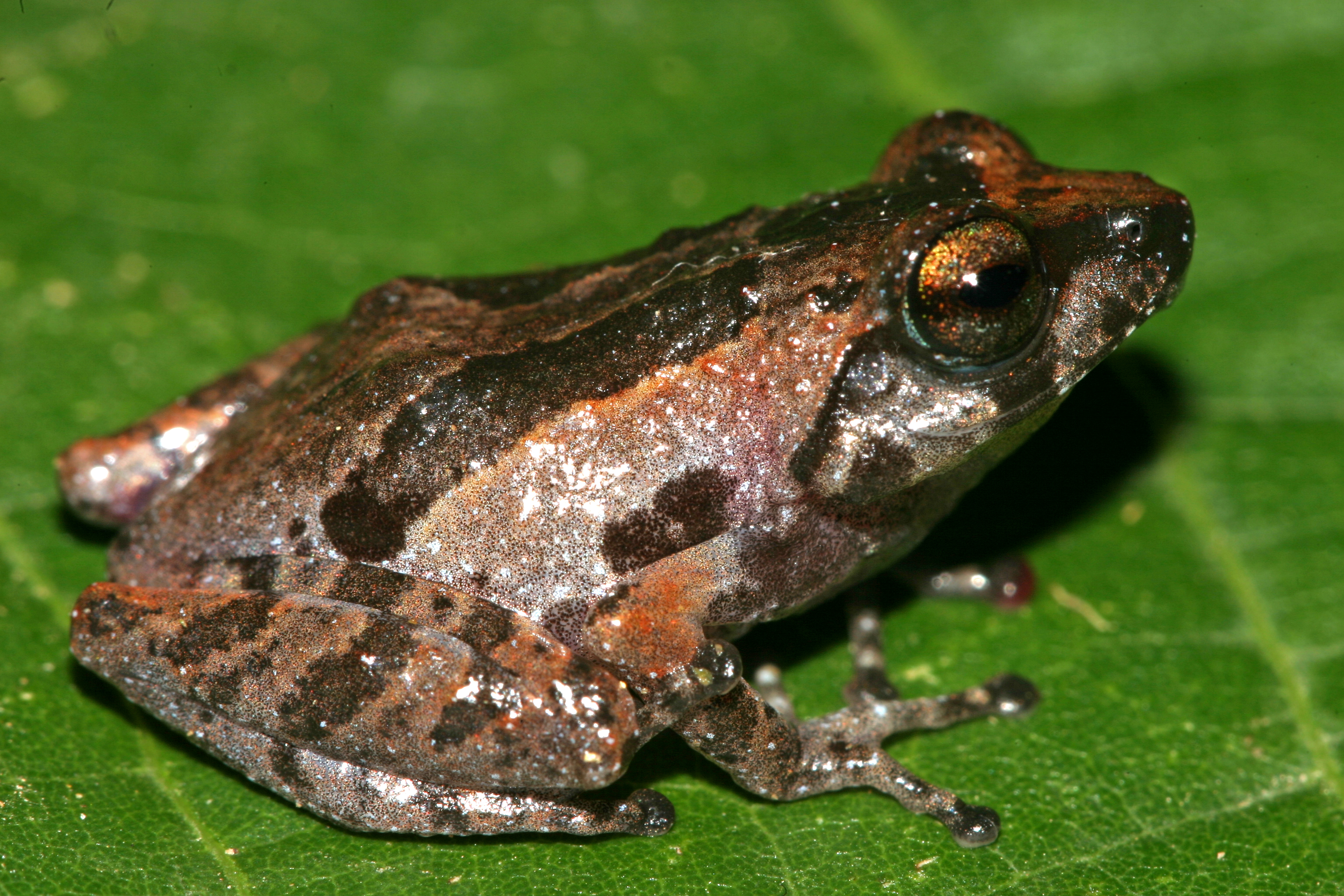

Conservation status
- Near Threatened (IUCN 3.1)

Scientific classification
- Kingdom: Animalia
- Phylum: Chordata
- Class: Amphibia
- Order: Anura
- Family: Rhacophoridae
- Genus: Raorchestes
- Species: R. kadalarensis

Binomial name
- Raorchestes kadalarensis Zachariah, Dinesh, Kunhikrishnan, Das, Raju, Radhakrishnan, Palot, and Kalesh, 2011

= Raorchestes kadalarensis =

Species of amphibian

Raorchestes kadalarensis is a species of frog of the genus Raorchestes found in Kadalar near Munnar in the Western Ghats of Kerala in India. This frog has been observed between 1300 and 1700 meters above sea level.

Scientists first observed this frog was a Kadalar tea farm in the Western Ghat mountains. Since then, they have seen the frogs in patches of disturbed forest between tea farms and in primary forest, where it dwells among the leaf litter near streams. This frog breeds through direct development with no free-swimming tadpole stage.

Scientists classify this frog as near threatened because about half the estimate population lives in protected parks: Srivilliputhur Wildlife Sanctuary, Meghamalai Wildlife Sanctuary, and Anamalai Tiger Reserve. Scientists cite climate change as a possible threat to this frog. Because it lives at high altitudes, it cannot simply migrate north if its habitat should become too warm or dry.

Scientists have found that the fungus Batrachochytrium dendrobatidis can infect other frogs in Raorchestes, so they infer it could infect R. kadalarensis with chytridiomycosis as well.

== Original description ==
- Zachariah A; Dinesh KP; Kunhikrishnan E; Das S; Raju DV; Radhakrishnan C; Palot MJ; Kalesh S (2011). "Nine new species of frogs of the genus Raorchestes (Amphibia: Anura: Rhacophoridae) from southern Western Ghats, India". Biosystematica (Excerpt). 5 (1): 25–48.
