= List of amphibians of India =

This is an index to the amphibians found in India. The amphibians of India show a high level of endemism. This list is based largely on the Zoological Survey of India's Fauna of India Checklist and from older books and journals.

There are 3 orders in the class Amphibia, the caecillians (Gymnophiona), the salamanders (Caudata) and the frogs and toads (Anura), all three of which are found in India.

There are 500 species found in India, out of which 456 are frogs and toads, 42 are caecillians, and 2 are salamanders.

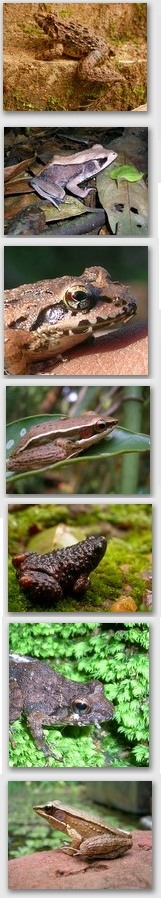
Some Indian frogs

== Bufonidae ==
- Beduka amboli Dubois, Ohler, and Pyron, 2021
- Beduka koynayensis (Soman, 1963)
- Blaira ornata (Günther, 1876)
- Blaira rubigina (Pillai and Pattabiraman, 1981)
- Blythophryne beryet Chandramouli, Vasudevan, Harikrishnan, Dutta, Janani, Sharma, Das, and Aggarwal, 2016
- Bufo gargarizans Cantor, 1842
- Bufoides bhupathyi Naveen, Tapley, Chandramouli, Jervis, Babu, Meetei, and Karunakaran, 2023
- Bufoides kempi (Boulenger, 1919)
- Bufoides meghalayanus (Yazdani and Chanda, 1971)
- Bufotes latastii (Boulenger, 1882)
- Duttaphrynus beddomii (Günther, 1876)
- Duttaphrynus brevirostris (Rao, 1937)
- Duttaphrynus chandai Das, Chetia, Dutta, and Sengupta, 2013
- Duttaphrynus himalayanus (Günther, 1864)
- Duttaphrynus kiphirensis (Mathew and Sen, 2009)
- Duttaphrynus mamitensis (Mathew and Sen, 2009)
- Duttaphrynus manipurensis (Mathew and Sen, 2009)
- Duttaphrynus melanostictus (Schneider, 1799)
- Duttaphrynus microtympanum (Boulenger, 1882)
- Duttaphrynus mizoramensis (Mathew and Sen, 2009)
- Duttaphrynus nagalandensis (Mathew and Sen, 2009)
- Duttaphrynus parietalis (Boulenger, 1882)
- Duttaphrynus phawngpui Dawngliana, Warjri, Amarasinghe, Bal, Hruaia, Hlychho, Lalremsanga, Vabeiryureilai, and Purkayastha, 2026
- Duttaphrynus scaber (Schneider, 1799)
- Duttaphrynus silentvalleyensis (Pillai, 1981)
- Duttaphrynus stuarti (Smith, 1929)
- Duttaphrynus wokhaensis (Mathew and Sen, 2009)
- Firouzophrynus hololius (Günther, 1876)
- Firouzophrynus olivaceus (Blanford, 1874)
- Firouzophrynus peninsularis (Rao, 1920)
- Firouzophrynus stomaticus (Lütken, 1864)
- Ingerophrynus macrotis (Boulenger, 1887)
- Pedostibes tuberculosus Günther, 1876

== Ceratobatrachidae ==
- Alcalus fontinalis Boruah, Narayanan, Gerard, Das, and Deepak, 2023
- Liurana himalayana Saikia and Sinha, 2019
- Liurana indica Saikia and Sinha, 2019
- Liurana medogensis Fei, Ye, and Huang, 1997
- Liurana minuta Saikia and Sinha, 2019

== Dicroglossidae ==
- Euphlyctis adolfi (Gunther, 1860)
- Euphlyctis cyanophlyctis (Schneider, 1799)
- Euphlyctis jaladhara Dinesh, Channakeshavamurthy, Deepak, Shabnam, Ghosh, and Deuti, 2022
- Fejervarya jhilmilensis Bahuguna, 2018
- Fejervarya limnocharis (Gravenhorst, 1829)
- Fejervarya moodiei (Taylor, 1920)
- Fejervarya multistriata (Hallowell, 1861)
- Fejervarya orissaensis (Dutta, 1997)
- Hoplobatrachus crassus (Jerdon, 1853)
- Hoplobatrachus litoralis Hasan, Kuramoto, Islam, Alam, Khan, and Sumida, 2012
- Hoplobatrachus tigerinus (Daudin, 1802)
- Ingerana borealis (Annandale, 1912)
- Ingerana aizawl Lalremsanga, Bharali, Dawngliana, Hlychho, Malsawmtluanga, Bhattacharjee, Hazarika, Das and Purkayastha, 2026
- Ingerana occidens Naveen, 2026
- Limnonectes ghoshi (Chanda, 1991)
- Limnonectes khasianus (Anderson, 1871)
- Limnonectes longchuanensis Suwannapoom, Yuan, Chen, Hou, Zhao, Wang, Nguyen, Murphy, Sullivan, McLeod and Che, 2016
- Limnonectes mawlyndipi (Chanda, 1990)
- Limnonectes motijheel Boruah, Rajiv, Dutta and Das, 2026
- Limnonectes shompenorum Das, 1996
- Minervarya agricola (Jerdon, 1853)
- Minervarya andamanensis (Stoliczka, 1870)
- Minervarya asmati (Howlader, 2011)
- Minervarya brevipalmata (Peters, 1871)
- Minervarya cepfi (Garg and Biju, 2017)
- Minervarya charlesdarwini (Das, 1998)
- Minervarya chilapata Ohler, Deuti, Grosjean, Paul, Ayyaswamy, Ahmed, and Dutta, 2009
- Minervarya ghatiborealis Yadav, Bhosale, Patil, Khandekar, and Dinesh, 2025
- Minervarya goemchi (Dinesh, Kulkarni, Swamy, and Deepak, 2018)
- Minervarya gomantaki (Dinesh, Vijayakumar, Channakeshavamurthy, Torsekar, Kulkarni, and Shanker, 2015)
- Minervarya kadar (Garg and Biju, 2017)
- Minervarya kalinga (Raj, Dinesh, Das, Dutta, Kar, and Mohapatra, 2018)
- Minervarya keralensis (Dubois, 1981)
- Minervarya krishnan (Raj, Dinesh, Das, Dutta, Kar, and Mohapatra, 2018)
- Minervarya manoharani (Garg and Biju, 2017)
- Minervarya marathi (Phuge, Dinesh, Andhale, Bhakare, and Pandit, 2019)
- Minervarya mysorensis (Rao, 1922)
- Minervarya neilcoxi (Garg and Biju, 2017)
- Minervarya nepalensis (Dubois, 1975)
- Minervarya nicobariensis (Stoliczka, 1870)
- Minervarya nilagirica (Jerdon, 1853)
- Minervarya pentali Garg and Biju, 2021
- Minervarya pierrei (Dubois, 1975)
- Minervarya rufescens (Jerdon, 1853)
- Minervarya sahyadris Dubois, Ohler, and Biju, 2001
- Minervarya sengupti (Purkayastha and Matsui, 2012)
- Minervarya syhadrensis (Annandale, 1919)
- Minervarya teraiensis (Dubois, 1984)
- Occidozyga lima (Gravenhorst, 1829)

== Hylidae ==
- Hyla annectans (Jerdon, 1870)
- Jingophrys hrdy Garg, Biju, Tajo, Upadhyaya and Hanken, 2026
- Jingophrys siangensis Garg, Biju, Tajo, Upadhyaya and Hanken, 2026
- Jingophrys taniitatii Garg, Biju, Tajo, Upadhyaya and Hanken, 2026
- Jingophrys tanogogo Garg, Biju, Tajo, Upadhyaya and Hanken, 2026
- Jingophrys wularsoni Garg, Biju, Tajo, Upadhyaya and Hanken, 2026
- Jingophrys vegrandis (Mahony, Teeling, Biju, 2013)
- Leptobrachella khasiorum (Das, Tron, Rangad, and Hooroo, 2010)
- Leptobrachella lateralis (Anderson, 1871)
- Leptobrachella nokrekensis (Mathew and Sen, 2010)
- Leptobrachella tamdil (Sengupta, Sailo, Lalremsanga, Das, and Das, 2010)
- Leptobrachium aryatium Purkayastha, Dutta, Gogoi and Sengupta, 2025
- Leptobrachium bompu Sondhi and Ohler, 2011
- Leptobrachium mechuka Sarmah, Garg, Tajo, Upadhyaya, Hanken and Biju, 2026
- Leptobrachium smithi Matsui, Nabhitabhata, and Panha, 1999
- Leptobrachium somani Sarmah, Garg, Tajo, Upadhyaya, Hanken and Biju, 2026
- Leptobrachium sylheticum Al-Razi, Maria, and Poyarkov, 2021
- Scutiger boulengeri (Bedriaga, 1898)
- Scutiger nyingchiensis Fei, 1977
- Scutiger occidentalis Dubois, 1978
- Scutiger sikimmensis (Blyth, 1855)
- Xenophrys ancrae (Mahony, Teeling, and Biju, 2013)
- Xenophrys apatani Saikia, Sinha, Shabnam, Kharkongor, and Dinesh, 2024
- Xenophrys awuh (Mahony, Kamei, Teeling, and Biju, 2020)
- Xenophrys dzukou (Mahony, Kamei, Teeling, and Biju, 2020)
- Xenophrys flavipunctata (Mahony, Kamei, Teeling, and Biju, 2018)
- Xenophrys himalayana (Mahony, Kamei, Teeling, and Biju, 2018)
- Xenophrys major (Boulenger, 1908)
- Xenophrys megacephala (Mahony, Sengupta, Kamei, and Biju, 2011)
- Xenophrys monticola Günther, 1864
- Xenophrys numhbumaeng (Mahony, Kamei, Teeling, and Biju, 2020)
- Xenophrys oreocrypta (Mahony, Kamei, Teeling, and Biju, 2018)
- Xenophrys oropedion (Mahony, Teeling, and Biju, 2013)
- Xenophrys periosa (Mahony, Kamei, Teeling, and Biju, 2018)
- Xenophrys robusta (Boulenger, 1908)
- Xenophrys serchhipii Mathew and Sen, 2007
- Xenophrys zunhebotoensis Mathew and Sen, 2007

== Micrixalidae ==
- Micrixalus adonis Biju, Garg, Gururaja, Shouche, and Walujkar, 2014
- Micrixalus candidus Biju, Garg, Gururaja, Shouche, and Walujkar, 2014
- Micrixalus elegans (Rao, 1937)
- Micrixalus frigidus Biju, Garg, Gururaja, Shouche, and Walujkar, 2014
- Micrixalus fuscus (Boulenger, 1882)
- Micrixalus gadgili Pillai and Pattabiraman, 1990
- Micrixalus herrei Myers, 1942
- Micrixalus kodayari Biju, Garg, Gururaja, Shouche, and Walujkar, 2014
- Micrixalus kottigeharensis (Rao, 1937)
- Micrixalus kurichiyari Biju, Garg, Gururaja, Shouche, and Walujkar, 2014
- Micrixalus mallani Biju, Garg, Gururaja, Shouche, and Walujkar, 2014
- Micrixalus nelliyampathi Biju, Garg, Gururaja, Shouche, and Walujkar, 2014
- Micrixalus nigraventris Biju, Garg, Gururaja, Shouche, and Walujkar, 2014
- Micrixalus niluvasei Biju, Garg, Gururaja, Shouche, and Walujkar, 2014
- Micrixalus nudis Pillai, 1978
- Micrixalus phyllophilus (Jerdon, 1853)
- Micrixalus sairandhri Biju, Garg, Gururaja, Shouche, and Walujkar, 2014
- Micrixalus sali Biju, Garg, Gururaja, Shouche, and Walujkar, 2014
- Micrixalus saxicola (Jerdon, 1853)
- Micrixalus silvaticus (Boulenger, 1882)
- Micrixalus specca Biju, Garg, Gururaja, Shouche, and Walujkar, 2014
- Micrixalus spelunca Biju, Garg, Gururaja, Shouche, and Walujkar, 2014
- Micrixalus thampii Pillai, 1981
- Micrixalus uttaraghati Biju, Garg, Gururaja, Shouche, and Walujkar, 2014

== Microhylidae ==
- Kalophrynus orangensis Dutta, Ahmed, and Das, 2000
- Melanobatrachus indicus Beddome, 1878
- Kaloula ghoshi Cherchi, 1954
- Kaloula pulchra Gray, 1831
- Microhyla berdmorei (Blyth, 1856)
- Microhyla butleri Boulenger, 1900
- Microhyla chakrapanii Pillai, 1977
- Microhyla darreli Garg, Suyesh, Das, Jiang, Wijayathilaka, Amarasinghe, Alhadi, Vineeth, Aravind, Senevirathne, Meegaskumbura, and Biju, 2019
- Microhyla eos Biju, Garg, Kamei, and Maheswaran, 2019
- Microhyla kodial Vineeth, Radhakrishna, Godwin, Anwesha, Rajashekhar, and Aravind, 2018
- Microhyla laterite Seshadri, Singal, Priti, Ravikanth, Vidisha, Saurabh, Pratik, and Gururaja, 2016
- Microhyla mukhlesuri Hasan, Islam, Kuramoto, Kurabayashi, and Sumida, 2014
- Microhyla mymensinghensis Hasan, Islam, Kuramoto, Kurabayashi, and Sumida, 2014
- Microhyla nakkavaram Garg, Sivaperuman, Gokulakrishnan, Chandramouli, and Biju, 2022
- Microhyla nilphamariensis Howlader, Nair, Gopalan, and Merilä, 2015
- Microhyla ornata (Duméril and Bibron, 1841)
- Microhyla rubra (Jerdon, 1853)
- Microhyla sholigari Dutta and Ray, 2000
- Microhyla taraiensis Khatiwada, Shu, Wang, Thapa, Wang, and Jiang, 2017
- Micryletta aishani Das, Garg, Hamidy, Smith, and Biju, 2019
- Mysticellus franki Garg and Biju, 2019
- Uperodon anamalaiensis (Rao, 1937)
- Uperodon assamensis (Das, Sengupta, Ahmed, and Dutta, 2005)
- Uperodon globulosus (Günther, 1864)
- Uperodon montanus (Jerdon, 1853)
- Uperodon mormoratus (Rao, 1937)
- Uperodon systoma (Schneider, 1799)
- Uperodon taprobanicus (Parker, 1934)
- Uperodon triangularis (Günther, 1876)
- Uperodon variegatus (Stoliczka, 1872)

== Nasikabatrachidae ==
- Nasikabatrachus bhupathi Janani, Vasudevan, Prendini, Dutta, and Aggarwal, 2017
- Nasikabatrachus sahyadrensis Biju and Bossuyt, 2003

== Nyctibatrachidae ==
- Astrobatrachus kurichiyana Vijayakumar, Pyron, Dinesh, Tors ekar, Srikanthan, Swamy, Stanley, Blackburn, and Shanker, 2019
- Nyctibatrachus acanthodermis Biju, Van Bocxlaer, Mahony, Dinesh, Radhakrishnan, Zachariah, Giri, and Bossuyt, 2011
- Nyctibatrachus aliciae Inger, Shaffer, Koshy, and Bakde, 1984
- Nyctibatrachus anamallaiensis (Myers, 1942)
- Nyctibatrachus athirappillyensis Garg, Suyesh, Sukesan, and Biju, 2017
- Nyctibatrachus beddomii (Boulenger, 1882)
- Nyctibatrachus danieli Biju, Van Bocxlaer, Mahony, Dinesh, Radhakrishnan, Zachariah, Giri, and Bossuyt, 2011
- Nyctibatrachus dattatreyaensis Dinesh, Radhakrishnan, and Bhatta, 2008
- Nyctibatrachus deccanensis Dubois, 1984
- Nyctibatrachus gavi Biju, Van Bocxlaer, Mahony, Dinesh, Radha krishnan, Zachariah, Giri, and Bossuyt, 2011
- Nyctibatrachus grandis Biju, Van Bocxlaer, Mahony, Dinesh, Radhakrishnan, Zachariah, Giri, and Bossuyt, 2011
- Nyctibatrachus humayuni Bhaduri and Kripalani, 1955
- Nyctibatrachus indraneili Biju, Van Bocxlaer, Mahony, Dinesh, Radhakrishnan, Zachariah, Giri, and Bossuyt, 2011
- Nyctibatrachus jog Biju, Van Bocxlaer, Mahony, Dinesh, Radha krishnan, Zachariah, Giri, and Bossuyt, 2011
- Nyctibatrachus kali Aravind, Ramesh, Naik, Gururaja and Priti, 2026
- Nyctibatrachus karnatakaensis Dinesh, Radhakrishnan, Manjunatha Reddy, and Gururaja, 2007
- Nyctibatrachus kempholeyensis (Rao, 1937)
- Nyctibatrachus kumbara Gururaja, Dinesh, Priti, and Ravikanth, 2014
- Nyctibatrachus major Boulenger, 1882
- Nyctibatrachus manalari Garg, Suyesh, Sukesan, and Biju, 2017
- Nyctibatrachus mewasinghi Krutha, Dahanukar, and Molur, 2017
- Nyctibatrachus minimus Biju, Van Bocxlaer, Giri, Roelants, Nagaraju, and Bossuyt, 2007
- Nyctibatrachus minor Inger, Shaffer, Koshy, and Bakde, 1984
- Nyctibatrachus petraeus Das and Kunte, 2005
- Nyctibatrachus poocha Biju, Van Bocxlaer, Mahony, Dinesh, Radhakrishnan, Zachariah, Giri, and Bossuyt, 2011
- Nyctibatrachus pulivijayani Garg, Suyesh, Sukesan, and Biju, 2017
- Nyctibatrachus radcliffei Garg, Suyesh, Sukesan, and Biju, 2017
- Nyctibatrachus robinmoorei Garg, Suyesh, Sukesan, and Biju, 2017
- Nyctibatrachus sabarimalai Garg, Suyesh, Sukesan, and Biju, 2017
- Nyctibatrachus sanctipalustris Rao, 1920
- Nyctibatrachus shiradi Biju, Van Bocxlaer, Mahony, Dinesh, Radhakrishnan, Zachariah, Giri, and Bossuyt, 2011
- Nyctibatrachus sylvaticus Rao, 1937
- Nyctibatrachus tunga Pavan Kumar, Vishwajith, Anisha, Dayananda, Gururaja, and Priti, 2022
- Nyctibatrachus vasanthi Ravichandran, 1997
- Nyctibatrachus vrijeuni Biju, Van Bocxlaer, Mahony, Dinesh, Radhakrishnan, Zachariah, Giri, and Bossuyt, 2011
- Nyctibatrachus webilla Garg, Suyesh, Sukesan, and Biju, 2017

== Ranidae ==
- Amolops adicola Patel, Garg, Das, Stuart, and Biju, 2021
- Amolops afghanus (Günther, 1858)
- Amolops ammachi Biju, Ellepola, Sarmah, Upadhyaya, Bisht, Tajo, Hanken and Garg, 2026
- Amolops aniqiaoensis Dong, Rao, and Lü, 2005
- Amolops assamensis Sengupta, Hussain, Choudhury, Gogoi, Ahmed, and Choudhury, 2008
- Amolops beibengensis Jiang, Li, Zou, Yan, and Che, 2020
- Amolops bella Biju, Ellepola, Sarmah, Upadhyaya, Bisht, Tajo, Hanken and Garg, 2026
- Amolops chakrataensis Ray, 1992
- Amolops chanakya Saikia, Laskar, Dinesh, Shabnam, and Sinha, 2022
- Amolops formosus (Günther, 1876)
- Amolops gerbillus (Annandale, 1912)
- Amolops himalayanus (Boulenger, 1888)
- Amolops indoburmanensis Dever, Fuiten, Konu, and Wilkinson, 2012
- Amolops jaunsari Ray, 1992
- Amolops kamal Saikia, Sinha, Shabnam, Narayan, Borthakur and Dinesh, 2026
- Amolops kohimaensis Biju, Mahony, and Kamei, 2010
- Amolops marmoratus (Blyth, 1855)
- Amolops medogensis Li and Rao, 2005
- Amolops monticola (Anderson, 1871)
- Amolops nidorbellus Biju, Mahony, and Kamei, 2010
- Amolops nepalicus Yang, 1991
- Amolops senchalensis Chanda, 1986
- Amolops sendenyu Biju, Ellepola, Sarmah, Upadhyaya, Bisht, Tajo, Hanken and Garg, 2026
- Amolops siju Saikia, Sinha, Shabnam, and Dinesh, 2023
- Amolops tawang Saikia, Laskar, Dinesh, Shabnam, and Sinha, 2022
- Amolops terraorchis Saikia, Sinha, Laskar, Shabnam, and Dinesh, 2022
- Amolops viridimaculatus (Jiang, 1983)
- Amolops wangyali Mahony, Nidup, Streicher, Teeling, and Kamei, 2022
- Amolops yarlungzangbo Che, Jiang, Yan, and Zhang, 2020
- Clinotarsus alticola (Boulenger, 1882)
- Clinotarsus curtipes (Jerdon, 1853)
- Hylarana aurantiaca (Boulenger, 1904)
- Hylarana bahuvistara (Padhye, Jadhav, Modak, Nameer, and Dahanukar, 2015)
- Hylarana caesari Biju, Garg, Mahony, Wijayathilaka, Senevirathne, and Meegaskumbura, 2014
- Hylarana chozhai Naveen, Chandramouli, Praveenraj and Babu, 2025
- Hylarana doni Biju, Garg, Mahony, Wijayathilaka, Senevirathne, and Meegaskumbura, 2014
- Hylarana erythraea (Schlegel, 1837)
- Hylarana flavescens (Jerdon, 1853)
- Hylarana garoensis (Boulenger, 1920)
- Hylarana gracilis (Gravenhorst, 1829)
- Hylarana humeralis (Boulenger, 1887)
- Hylarana indica Biju, Garg, Mahony, Wijayathilaka, Senevirathne, and Meegaskumbura, 2014
- Hylarana intermedia (Rao, 1937)
- Hylarana khare (Kiyasetuo and Khare, 1986)
- Hylarana lacrima (Sheridan and Stuart, 2018)
- Hylarana leptoglossa (Cope, 1868)
- Hylarana magna Biju, Garg, Mahony, Wijayathilaka, Senevirathne, and Meegaskumbura, 2014
- Hylarana malabarica (Tschudi, 1838)
- Hylarana montana (Rao, 1922)
- Hylarana nicobariensis (Stoliczka, 1870)
- Hylarana nigrovittata (Blyth, 1856)
- Hylarana sreeni Biju, Garg, Mahony, Wijayathilaka, Senevirathne, and Meegaskumbura, 2014
- Hylarana tytleri Theobald, 1868
- Hylarana urbis Biju, Garg, Mahony, Wijayathilaka, Senevirathne, and Megaskumbura, 2014
- Nidirana noadihing Boruah, Deepak, and Das, 2023
- Odorrana andersonii (Boulenger, 1882)
- Odorrana arunachalensis Saikia, Sinha, and Kharkongor, 2017
- Odorrana chloronota (Günther, 1876)
- Odorrana livida (Blyth, 1856)
- Odorrana mawphlangensis (Pillai and Chanda, 1977)

== Ranixalidae ==
- Indirana beddomii (Günther, 1876)
- Indirana bhadrai Garg and Biju, 2016
- Indirana brachytarsus (Günther, 1876)
- Indirana chiravasi Padhye, Modak, and Dahanukar, 2014
- Indirana duboisi Dahanukar, Modak, Krutha, Nameer, Padhye, and Molur, 2016
- Indirana gundia (Dubois, 1986)
- Indirana leithii (Boulenger, 1888)
- Indirana longicrus (Rao, 1937)
- Indirana paramakri Garg and Biju, 2016
- Indirana salelkari Modak, Dahanukar, Gosavi, and Padhye, 2015
- Indirana sarojamma Dahanukar, Modak, Krutha, Nameer, Padhye, and Molur, 2016
- Indirana semipalmata (Boulenger, 1882)
- Indirana tysoni Dahanukar, Modak, Krutha, Nameer, Padhye, and Molur, 2016
- Indirana yadera Dahanukar, Modak, Krutha, Nameer, Padhye, and Molur, 2016
- Walkerana diplosticta (Günther, 1876)
- Walkerana leptodactyla (Boulenger, 1882)
- Walkerana muduga Dinesh, Vijayakumar, Ramesh, Jayarajan, Chandramouli, and Shanker, 2020
- Walkerana phrynoderma (Boulenger, 1882)

== Rhacophoridae ==
- Beddomixalus bijui (Zachariah, Dinesh, Radhakrishnan, Kunhikrishnan, Palot, and Vishnudas, 2011)
- Chirixalus doriae Boulenger, 1893
- Chirixalus dudhwaensis Ray, 1992
- Chirixalus nongkhorensis (Cochran, 1927)
- Chirixalus simus Annandale, 1915
- Feihyla senapatiensis (Mathew and Sen, 2009)
- Feihyla shyamrupus (Chanda and Ghosh, 1989)
- Feihyla vittatus (Boulenger, 1887)
- Ghatixalus asterops Biju, Roelants, and Bossuyt, 2008
- Ghatixalus magnus Abraham, Mathew, Cyriac, Zachariah, Raju, and Zachariah, 2015
- Ghatixalus variabilis (Jerdon, 1853)
- Gracixalus medogensis (Ye and Hu, 1984)
- Gracixalus patkaiensis Boruah, Deepak, Patel, Jithin, Yomcha, and Das, 2023
- Kurixalus naso (Annandale, 1912)
- Kurixalus yangi Yu, Hui, Rao, and Yang, 2018
- Mercurana myristicapalustris Abraham, Pyron, Ansil, Zachariah, and Zachariah, 2013
- Nasutixalus jerdonii (Günther, 1876)
- Philautus dubius (Boulenger, 1882)
- Philautus kempii (Annandale, 1912)
- Philautus microdiscus (Annandale, 1912)
- Philautus namdaphaensis Sarkar and Sanyal, 1985
- Polypedates assamensis Mathew and Sen, 2009
- Polypedates bengalensis Purkayastha, Das, Mondal, Mitra, and Das, 2019
- Polypedates braueri (Vogt, 1911)
- Polypedates himalayensis (Annandale, 1912)
- Polypedates insularis Das, 1995
- Polypedates maculatus (Gray, 1830)
- Polypedates megacephalus Hallowell, 1861
- Polypedates mutus (Smith, 1940)
- Polypedates occidentalis Das and Dutta, 2006
- Polypedates pseudocruciger Das and Ravichandran, 1998
- Polypedates subansiriensis Mathew and Sen, 2009
- Polypedates taeniatus (Boulenger, 1906)
- Polypedates teraiensis (Dubois, 1987)
- Pseudophilautus amboli (Biju and Bossuyt, 2009)
- Pseudophilautus kani (Biju and Bossuyt, 2009)
- Pseudophilautus regius (Manamendra-Arachchi and Pethiyagoda, 2005)
- Pseudophilautus wynaadensis (Jerdon, 1853)
- Raorchestes agasthyaensis Zachariah, Dinesh, Kunhikrishnan, Das, Raju, Radhakrishnan, Palot, and Kalesh, 2011
- Raorchestes akroparallagi (Biju and Bossuyt, 2009)
- Raorchestes andersoni (Ahl, 1927)
- Raorchestes anili (Biju and Bossuyt, 2006)
- Raorchestes annandalii (Boulenger, 1906)
- Raorchestes archeos Vijayakumar, Dinesh, Prabhu, and Shanker, 2014
- Raorchestes arunachalensis Boruah, Deepak and Das, 2025
- Raorchestes asakgrensis Naveen, Chandramouli, and Babu, 2024
- Raorchestes aureus Vijayakumar, Dinesh, Prabhu, and Shanker, 2014
- Raorchestes barakensis Boruah, Deepak and Das, 2025
- Raorchestes beddomii (Günther, 1876)
- Raorchestes blandus Vijayakumar, Dinesh, Prabhu, and Shanker, 2014
- Raorchestes bobingeri (Biju and Bossuyt, 2005)
- Raorchestes bombayensis (Annandale, 1919)
- Raorchestes boulengeri Boruah, Deepak and Das, 2025
- Raorchestes chalazodes (Günther, 1876)
- Raorchestes charius (Rao, 1937)
- Raorchestes chlorosomma (Biju and Bossuyt, 2009)
- Raorchestes chotta (Biju and Bossuyt, 2009)
- Raorchestes chromasynchysi (Biju and Bossuyt, 2009)
- Raorchestes coonoorensis (Biju and Bossuyt, 2009)
- Raorchestes crustai Zachariah, Dinesh, Kunhikrishnan, Das, Raju, Radhakrishnan, Palot, and Kalesh, 2011
- Raorchestes dibangensis Boruah, Deepak and Das, 2025
- Raorchestes drutaahu Garg, Suyesh, Das, Bee, and Biju, 2021
- Raorchestes dubois (Biju and Bossuyt, 2006)
- Raorchestes eaglenestensis Boruah, Deepak and Das, 2025
- Raorchestes echinatus Vijayakumar, Dinesh, Prabhu, and Shanker, 2014
- Raorchestes flaviocularis Vijayakumar, Dinesh, Prabhu, and Shanker, 2014
- Raorchestes flaviventris (Boulenger, 1882)
- Raorchestes garo (Boulenger, 1919)
- Raorchestes ghatei Padhye, Sayyed, Jadhav, and Dahanukar, 2013
- Raorchestes glandulosus (Jerdon, 1853)
- Raorchestes graminirupes (Biju and Bossuyt, 2005)
- Raorchestes griet (Bossuyt, 2002)
- Raorchestes hassanensis (Dutta, 1985)
- Raorchestes honnametti Gururaja,Priti, Roshmi, and Aravind, 2016
- Raorchestes indigo Vijayakumar, Dinesh, Prabhu, and Shanker, 2014
- Raorchestes jadoh Warjri, Purkayastha, Lalremsanga and Das, 2025
- Raorchestes jakoid Warjri, Purkayastha, Lalremsanga and Das, 2025
- Raorchestes jayarami (Biju and Bossuyt, 2009)
- Raorchestes johnceei Zachariah, Dinesh, Kunhikrishnan, Das, Raju, Radhakrishnan, Palot, and Kalesh, 2011
- Raorchestes kadalarensis Zachariah, Dinesh, Kunhikrishnan, Das, Raju, Radhakrishnan, Palot, and Kalesh, 2011
- Raorchestes kaikatti (Biju and Bossuyt, 2009)
- Raorchestes kakachi Seshadri, Gururaja, and Aravind, 2012
- Raorchestes kakkayamensis Garg, Suyesh, Das, Bee, and Biju, 2021
- Raorchestes keirasabinae Garg, Suyesh, Das, Bee, and Biju, 2021
- Raorchestes kempiae (Boulenger, 1919)
- Raorchestes khonoma Boruah, Deepak and Das, 2025
- Raorchestes kollimalai Gowande, Ganesh, and Mirza, 2020
- Raorchestes lawngtlaiensis Boruah, Deepak and Das, 2025
- Raorchestes lechiya Zachariah, Cyriac, Chandramohan, Ansil, Mathew, Raju, and Abraham, 2016
- Raorchestes leucolatus Vijayakumar, Dinesh, Prabhu, and Shanker, 2014
- Raorchestes luteolus (Kuramoto and Joshy, 2003)
- Raorchestes magnus Boruah, Deepak and Das, 2025
- Raorchestes manipurensis (Mathew and Sen, 2009)
- Raorchestes manohari Zachariah, Dinesh, Kunhikrishnan, Das, Raju, Radhakrishnan, Palot, and Kalesh, 2011
- Raorchestes marki (Biju and Bossuyt, 2009)
- Raorchestes mawsynramensis Boruah, Deepak and Das, 2025
- Raorchestes monolithus Boruah, Deepak and Das, 2025
- Raorchestes munnarensis (Biju and Bossuyt, 2009)
- Raorchestes narpuhensis Boruah, Deepak and Das, 2025
- Raorchestes nasuta Boruah, Deepak and Das, 2025
- Raorchestes nerostagona (Biju and Bossuyt, 2005)
- Raorchestes ochlandrae (Gururaja, Dinesh, Palot, Radhakrishnan, and Ramachandra, 2007)
- Raorchestes orientalis Boruah, Deepak and Das, 2025
- Raorchestes ponmudi (Biju and Bossuyt, 2005)
- Raorchestes primarrumpfi Vijayakumar, Dinesh, Prabhu, and Shanker, 2014
- Raorchestes ravii Zachariah, Dinesh, Kunhikrishnan, Das, Raju, Radhakrishnan, Palot, and Kalesh, 2011
- Raorchestes resplendens Biju, Shouche, Dubois, Dutta, and Bossuyt, 2010
- Raorchestes rezakhani Al-Razi, Maria, and Muzaffar, 2020
- Raorchestes sahai (Sarkar and Ray, 2006)
- Raorchestes sanctisilvaticus (Das and Chanda, 1997)
- Raorchestes sanjappai Garg, Suyesh, Das, Bee, and Biju, 2021
- Raorchestes shillongensis (Pillai and Chanda, 1973)
- Raorchestes signatus (Boulenger, 1882)
- Raorchestes silentvalley Zachariah, Cyriac, Chandramohan, Ansil, Mathew, Raju, and Abraham, 2016
- Raorchestes sushili (Biju and Bossuyt, 2009)
- Raorchestes theuerkaufi Zachariah, Dinesh, Kunhikrishnan, Das, Raju, Radhakrishnan, Palot, and Kalesh, 2011
- Raorchestes thodai Zachariah, Dinesh, Kunhikrishnan, Das, Raju, Radhakrishnan, Palot, and Kalesh, 2011
- Raorchestes tinniens (Jerdon, 1853)
- Raorchestes travancoricus (Boulenger, 1891)
- Raorchestes tuberohumerus (Kuramoto and Joshy, 2003)
- Rhacophorus bipunctatus Ahl, 1927
- Rhacophorus lateralis Boulenger, 1883
- Rhacophorus malabaricus Jerdon, 1870
- Rhacophorus namdaphaensis Sarkar and Sanyal, 1985
- Rhacophorus pseudomalabaricus Vasudevan and Dutta, 2000
- Rhacophorus rhodopus Liu and Hu, 1960
- Rhacophorus subansiriensis Mathew and Sen, 2009
- Rhacophorus translineatus Wu, 1977
- Rhacophorus tuberculatus (Anderson, 1871)
- Tamixalus calcadensis Ahl, 1927
- Theloderma albopunctatum (Liu and Hu, 1962)
- Theloderma baibungense (Jiang, Fei, and Huang, 2009)
- Theloderma moloch (Annandale, 1912)
- Theloderma nagalandense Orlov, Dutta, Ghate, and Kent, 2006
- Zhangixalus burmanus (Andersson, 1939)
- Zhangixalus smaragdinus (Blyth, 1852)
- Zhangixalus suffry (Bordoloi, Bortamuli, and Ohler, 2007)

== Salamandridae ==
- Tylototriton zaimeng Decemson, Lalremsanga, Elangbam, Mathipi, Shinde, Purkayastha, Arkhipov, Bragin, and Poyarkov, 2023
- Tylototriton himalayanus Khatiwada, Wang, Ghimire, Vasudevan, Paudel, and Jiang, 2015

== Chikilidae ==
- Chikila alcocki Kamei, Gower, Wilkinson, and Biju, 2013
- Chikila darlong Kamei, Gower, Wilkinson, and Biju, 2013
- Chikila fulleri (Alcock, 1904)
- Chikila gaiduwani Kamei, Gower, Wilkinson, and Biju, 2013

== Grandisoniidae ==
- Gegeneophis bavali Kotharambath, Vengot and Gower, 2026
- Gegeneophis carnosus (Beddome, 1870)
- Gegeneophis chandgadi Shikalgar, Patil, Adhav, Kulkarni, Hiragond, Gramapurohit, Tripathy and Dinesh, 2026
- Gegeneophis danieli Giri, Wilkinson, and Gower, 2003
- Gegeneophis goaensis Bhatta, Dinesh, Prashanth, and Kulkarni, 2007
- Gegeneophis krishni Pillai and Ravichandran, 1999
- Gegeneophis madhavai Bhatta and Srinivasa, 2004
- Gegeneophis mhadeiensis Bhatta, Dinesh, Prashanth, and Kulkarni, 2007
- Gegeneophis orientalis Agarwal, Wilkinson, Mohapatra, Dutta, Giri, and Gower, 2013
- Gegeneophis pareshi Giri, Gower, Gaikwad, and Wilkinson, 2011
- Gegeneophis primus Kotharambath, Gower, Oommen, and Wilkinson, 2012
- Gegeneophis ramaswamii Taylor, 1964
- Gegeneophis seshachari Ravichandran, Gower, and Wilkinson, 2003
- Gegeneophis tejaswini Kotharambath, Wilkinson, Oommen, and Gower, 2015
- Gegeneophis valmiki Dinesh, Shikalgar, Adhav, Jadhav and Kulkarni, 2026
- Indotyphlus battersbyi Taylor, 1960
- Indotyphlus maharashtraensis Giri, Wilkinson, and Gower, 2004
- Ichthyophis alfredi Mathew and Sen, 2009
- Ichthyophis beddomei Peters, 1880
- Ichthyophis benjii Lalremsanga, Purkayastha, Biakzuala, Mathipi, Muansanga, and Hmar, 2021
- Ichthyophis daribokensis Mathew and Sen, 2009
- Ichthyophis davidi Bhatta, Dinesh, Prashanth, Kulkarni, and Radhakrishnan, 2011
- Ichthyophis garoensis Pillai and Ravichandran, 1999
- Ichthyophis khumhzi Kamei, Wilkinson, Gower, and Biju, 2009
- Ichthyophis kodaguensis Wilkinson, Gower, Govindappa, and Venkatachalaiah, 2007
- Ichthyophis longicephalus Pillai, 1986
- Ichthyophis moustakius Kamei, Wilkinson, Gower, and Biju, 2009
- Ichthyophis multicolor Wilkinson, Presswell, Sherratt, Papadopoulou, and Gower, 2014
- Ichthyophis nokrekensis Mathew and Sen, 2009
- Ichthyophis sendenyu Kamei, Wilkinson, Gower, and Biju, 2009
- Ichthyophis sikkimensis Taylor, 1960
- Ichthyophis tricolor Annandale, 1909
- Uraeotyphlus bombayensis (Taylor, 1960)
- Uraeotyphlus gansi Gower, Rajendran, Nussbaum, and Wilkinson, 2008
- Uraeotyphlus interruptus Pillai and Ravichandran, 1999
- Uraeotyphlus malabaricus (Beddome, 1870)
- Uraeotyphlus menoni Annandale, 1913
- Uraeotyphlus narayani Seshachar, 1939
- Uraeotyphlus oommeni Gower and Wilkinson, 2007
- Uraeotyphlus oxyurus (Duméril and Bibron, 1841)
