= Raorchestes drutaahu =

Conservation status
- Data Deficient (IUCN 3.1)

Scientific classification
- Kingdom: Animalia
- Phylum: Chordata
- Class: Amphibia
- Order: Anura
- Family: Rhacophoridae
- Genus: Raorchestes
- Species: R. drutaahu

Binomial name
- Raorchestes drutaahu Garg, Suyesh, Das, Bee, and Biju, 2021

Species of frog

Raorchestes drutaahu, the fast-calling shrub frog, is a species of frog in the family Rhacophoridae. It is endemic to in India. Scientists have observed this frog in Kodaikanal in the Western Ghat mountains, between 1,000 and 1,450 m (3,280 and 4,760 ft) above sea level. This frog has been observed in shola and in the grassy places nearby. It perches on shrubs 0.5 to 1.4 m (1.6 to 4.6 ft) above the ground. It has also been observed on tea plantations. Like other frogs in Raorchestes, this frog breeds through direct development with no free-swimming tadpole stage. This frog may be threatened by deforestation and habitat fragmentation associated with tea plantations and may suffer from widespread pesticide use.

== Taxonomy ==
Raorchestes drutaahu was described in 2021 by the herpetologist Sonali Garg and her colleagues based on an adult male specimen collected in Munnar in the Indian state of Kerala. The specific epithet is derived from Sanskrit druta (meaning fast) and ahu (meaning call), referring to the fast-pulsatile calls of the species.

Raorchestes drutaahu is a member of the Raorchestes charius group within its genus and is most closely related to R. coonoorensis.

== Description ==
Raorchestes drutaahu is a small species, with a male snout–vent length of 20–23 mm. In the male holotype, the dorsum is brown, with two dark brown )( shaped concave bands, extending from behind the eyes to the level of the groin. There is a faint dark grey stripe between the eyes and a pair of black irregular shaped spots on either side of the posterior dorsum near the groin. The sides of the head are dark brown, while the sides of the body are lighter than the dorsum. The groin is light greyish-brown, with no blotches. The anterior and posterior surface of thighs brown with dark greyish-brown mottling. There are dark blackish-brown markings around the cloacal opening. The fore and hind limbs are brown or light brown with a few scattered dark brown cross-bands. The underside is light brown with minute dark brown speckling. The underside of the hand and foot are greyish-brown. The iris is brown with a golden tinge and the upper half is lighter than the lower half.

The dorsal colouration and markings are variable; some specimens have dark blackish-brown markings around the cloacal opening, surrounded with white patches, a greyish-brown dorsum with prominent dark brown markings and dark brown stripe between eyes, or light greyish-brown to straw-coloured dorsum with faint and irregular dark brown dorsal markings.

== Distribution and habitat ==
The frog is endemic to the Western Ghats and currently known only from elevations ranging between 1,000 and 1,450 m at two localities: Kadalar in Idukki district (south of the Palghat gap) and Siruvani in Palakkad district (north of the Palghat gap). The species has been observed in forest areas, either on grassland-shola fringes or fragmented forest patches near plantations. Individuals were located on leaves of short shrubs at heights of 0.5–1.5 m.

== Vocalisations ==
Males produce a single type of call. Calls are relatively short and closely packed pulses. A typical call shows a duration of 50.6 ms, with a rise time of 1.2 ms and fall time of 49.1 ms. Six pulses are delivered at a rate of 134.5 pulses/second and the spectrum has a single broad peak with mean dominant frequency of 3.6 kHz.
