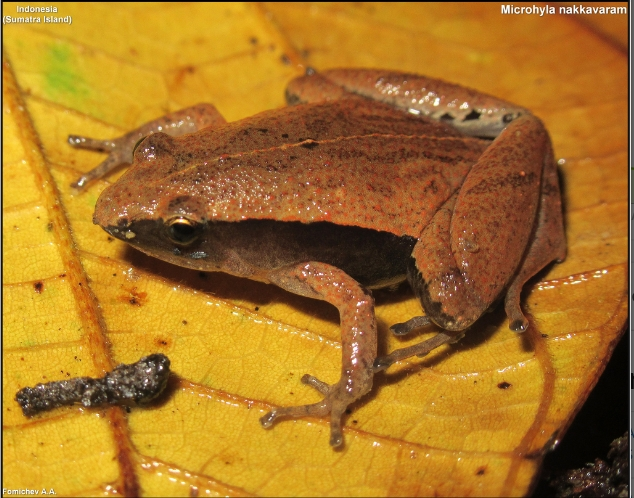

Conservation status
- Data Deficient (IUCN 3.1)

Scientific classification
- Kingdom: Animalia
- Phylum: Chordata
- Class: Amphibia
- Order: Anura
- Family: Microhylidae
- Genus: Microhyla
- Species: M. nakkavaram

Binomial name
- Microhyla nakkavaram Garg, Sivaperuman, Gokulakrishnan, Chandramouli, 2022

= Microhyla nakkavaram =

Species of frog

Microhyla nakkavaram is a species of narrow-mouthed frog in the family Microhylidae. It was described as a new species in 2022 from the Nicobar Islands of India. The species is known from the southern group of the Nicobar Islands, including Great Nicobar, Kondul, and Little Nicobar. It was previously confused with Microhyla heymonsi, but morphological and molecular evidence showed that the Nicobar population represents a distinct species.

== Discovery ==
The discovery of Microhyla nakkavaram resulted from a taxonomic study of the Microhyla heymonsi species complex in the Nicobar Islands of India. The Nicobar population had previously been identified as Microhyla cf. heymonsi, but researchers found significant differences between this population and typical M. heymonsi. Morphological examination and molecular analysis of the mitochondrial 16S rRNA gene demonstrated that the Nicobar population was both morphologically and genetically distinct from its close relatives. Based on this evidence, Sonali Garg and colleagues formally described the population as a new species, Microhyla nakkavaram, in 2022. The type series consisted of a holotype and five paratypes collected from Campbell Bay on Great Nicobar Island.

The discovery also showed that the species was not restricted to a single locality. Researchers recorded M. nakkavaram from Great Nicobar, Kondul, and Little Nicobar islands, where it was found in a variety of habitats, particularly during the monsoon season. The study highlighted the importance of reassessing populations that had previously been identified as M. heymonsi, as further investigation may reveal additional overlooked diversity within the species complex.

== Taxonomy ==
Microhyla nakkavaram belongs to the family Microhylidae and the genus Microhyla, a diverse group of small narrow-mouthed frogs. The species was formally described by Sonali Garg, Chandrakasan Sivaperuman, G. Gokulakrishnan, S. R. Chandramouli and S. D. Biju in 2022.

Molecular phylogenetic analysis based on the mitochondrial 16S rRNA gene placed M. nakkavaram within the Microhyla achatina species group. The study found that it forms a distinct evolutionary lineage and differs genetically from other known members of the genus by at least 3.5%. The species had previously been confused with Microhyla heymonsi, but morphological and molecular evidence supported its recognition as a separate species.

== Description ==
The lateral surfaces are prominently dark blackish-brown, extending from the snout towards the groin, with ash-blue mottling on the lower parts. The fingers have weakly expanded discs with a median dorso-terminal groove, and three distinct metacarpal tubercles are present. Webbing between the toes is rudimentary, while both inner and outer metatarsal tubercles are present. The tibiotarsal articulation of the straightened hind limb reaches approximately to the eye.

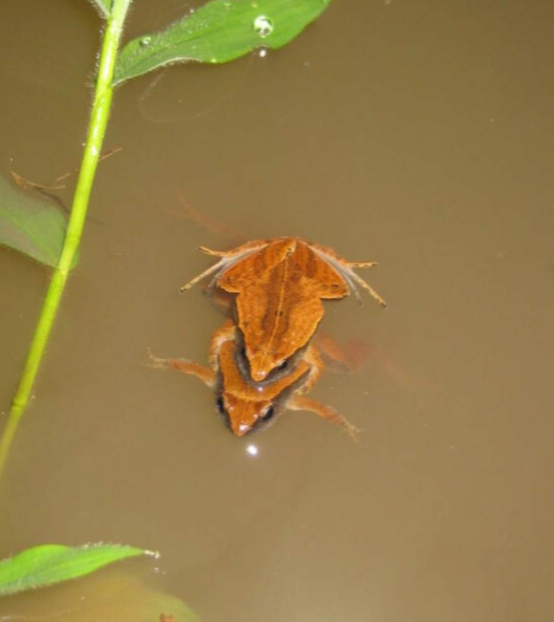
A pair of frogs in amplexus on the surface of a pond

Microhyla nakkavaram is a small, slender frog. Males have a snout–vent length (SVL) of 16–19 mm, while females reach about 21 mm. The snout is rounded in lateral view, and the dorsum is sparsely to uniformly granular. The species has a thin, light-coloured mid-dorsal line extending from the tip of the snout to the vent, along with two small tubercles on the middle of the dorsum associated with distinctive curved markings.
