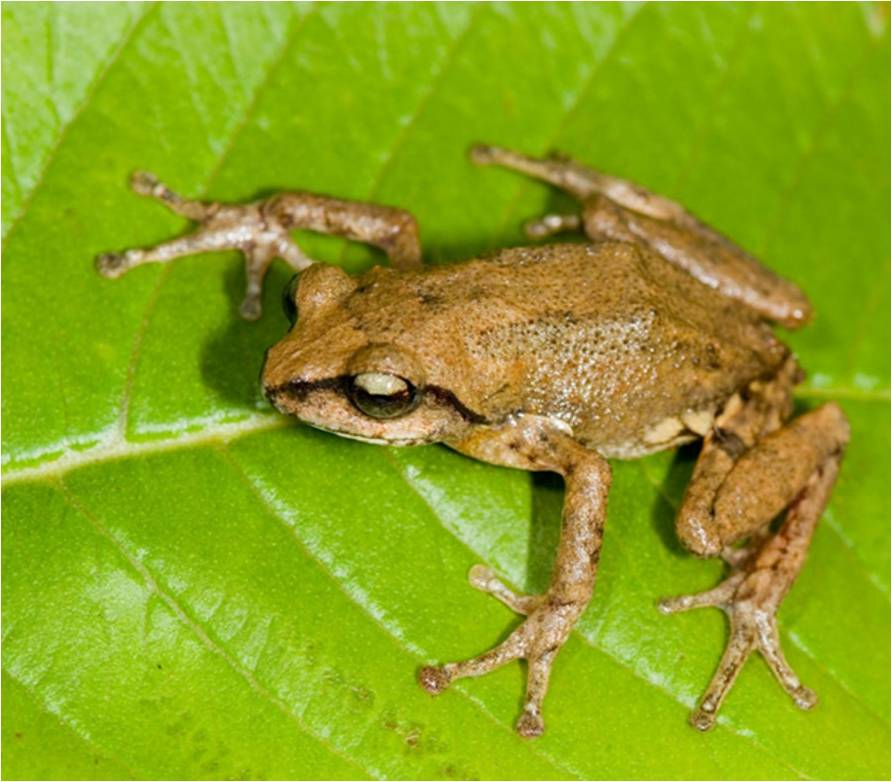
- Adult Raorchestes honnametti

Conservation status
- Near Threatened (IUCN 3.1)

Scientific classification
- Kingdom: Animalia
- Phylum: Chordata
- Class: Amphibia
- Order: Anura
- Family: Rhacophoridae
- Genus: Raorchestes
- Species: R. honnametti

Binomial name
- Raorchestes honnametti Gururaja, Priti, Roshmi, and Aravind, 2016

= Raorchestes honnametti =

Species of frog

Raorchestes honnametti (Honnametti bush frog) is a species of frog in the family Rhacophoridae that is described from the Biligiri Rangaswamy Tiger Reserve in Karnataka. This frog has been observed between 600 and 1800 meters above sea level.

== Description ==
Raorchestes honnametti is a relatively small sized frog, between 15 and 45 mm, is active at night and has a translucent vocal sac. The adult male is small, between 21.7 and 24.8 mm based on six specimens. Its snout is longer than the horizontal diameter of the eye. The groin has 3–4 yellow blotches. Yellow blotches also present on the anterior and posterior part of the thigh. The hindlimbs are short compared to other members in this genus. Based on molecular analysis, this species is closely related to Raorchestes charius.

In life, overall dorsal coloration is light grey with two dark grey concave stripes starting behind the eye and going all the way till the groin. The light brown stripes makes the snout region appear like a light grey triangle. The iris is golden above and light golden below and is separated by brown, horizontal band. Dark grey cross bands on the dorsal side of forelimbs and hind limbs. Tip of the snout has a triangular white spot. The ventral parts are uniform cream white. Vocal sac yellow but translucent.

This frog undergoes direct development. It hatches from its egg as a small froglet with no free-swimming tadpole stage.

== Distribution and ecology ==
Raorchestes honnametti is locally common and known only from Biligiri Rangaswamy hills. Its occurrence ranges from the upper montane or shola forests, semi-evergreen forests and even around human habitations. Individuals can be found calling in open areas where they call from shrubs and bushes at a height between 0.5–1 m from ground. Vocalization begins around 1800 h and continues till early morning.

This frog is not specifically endangered, but it is in decline. Because much of its range is within protected tiger preserves, Biligiri Ranga Swamy Temple Tiger Reserve and Sathyamangalam Tiger Reserve, it has not suffered from as much habitat loss as many of its congeners. However, it is still at risk from invasive species that have entered the preserve: Lantana camara and Ageratina adenophora. Scientists believe these new frogs are outcompeting the Honnametti bush frog. Climate change could also threaten this frog by causing its habitat to become drier. Scientists believe the fungus Batrachochytrium dendrobatidis could kill this frog through the disease chytridiomycosis.

== Etymology ==
The specific name honnametti refers to its type locality from where the species was described.
