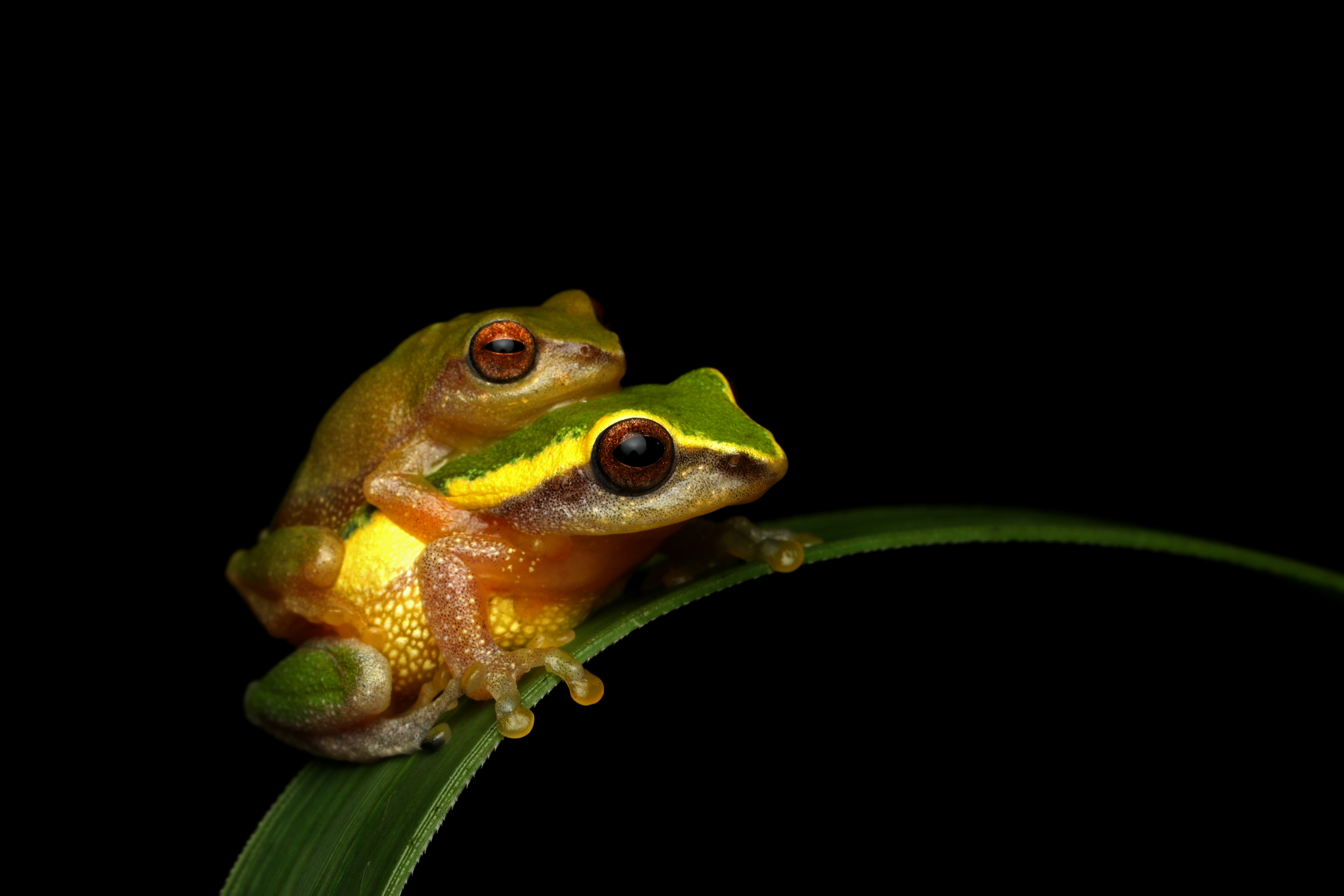
- Raorchestes akroparallagi

Conservation status
- Least Concern (IUCN 3.1)

Scientific classification
- Kingdom: Animalia
- Phylum: Chordata
- Class: Amphibia
- Order: Anura
- Family: Rhacophoridae
- Genus: Raorchestes
- Species: R. akroparallagi

Binomial name
- Raorchestes akroparallagi (Biju and Bossuyt, 2009)

Synonyms
- Philautus akroparallagi Biju and Bossuyt, 2009

= Raorchestes akroparallagi =

Variable bush frog

Species of amphibian

Raorchestes akroparallagi (sometimes known as the variable bush frog) is a species of frogs in the family Rhacophoridae.

It is endemic to the Western Ghats, India, where it is known from the states of Kerala and Tamil Nadu. Before its description in 2009, it was confused with Raorchestes femoralis and Raorchestes glandulosus.

== Description ==
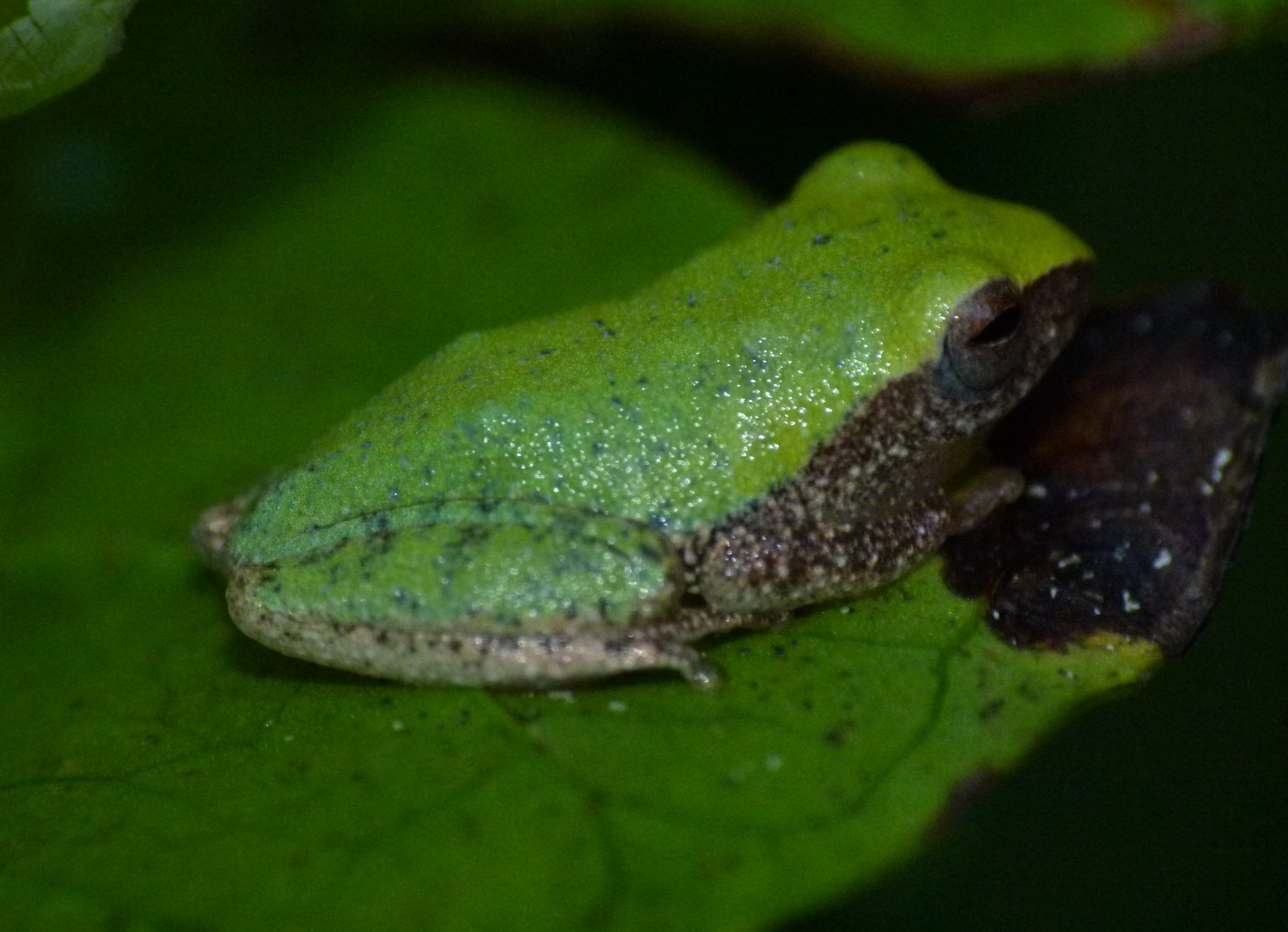
Raorchestes akroparallagi from Wynaad

Male Raorchestes akroparallagi are small, 19–22.5 mm (0.75–0.89 in) in snout-vent length, whereas females are larger, 26–27 mm (1.0–1.1 in) long. It is one of predominantly green Raorchestes. However, the colouration of its dorsum (back) is highly variable even within a single location, from almost uniformly green to various colours and markings. Indeed, its specific name, akroparallagi, is derived from Greek words akro, meaning 'extreme' and parallagi, meaning 'variation'.

== Reproduction ==
Raorchestes akroparallagi has direct development, with all growth inside the egg and no free-swimming tadpole stage. Males attract females with their calls. Mating takes place during the night. A pair in amplexus may move around before settling on a leaf and starting to lay eggs on its upper side. Egg laying takes hours and results in a clutch of 20–41 eggs. Eggs are white, about 4.4 mm (0.17 in) in diameter, and hatch after four weeks as fully developed froglets. There is no parental care.

== Habitat ==
Raorchestes akroparallagi is relatively widespread and occurs in a wide range of habitats and can live in disturbed habitats. It is found in evergreen forests to plantations near forest fringes and in roadside vegetation. It has been observed between 180 and 1425 meters above sea level. IUCN does not considered it threatened.
