= Raorchestes primarrumpfi =

Conservation status
- Critically Endangered (IUCN 3.1)

Scientific classification
- Kingdom: Animalia
- Phylum: Chordata
- Class: Amphibia
- Order: Anura
- Family: Rhacophoridae
- Genus: Raorchestes
- Species: R. primarrumpfi

Binomial name
- Raorchestes primarrumpfi Vijayakumar, Dinesh, Prabhu, and Shanker, 2014

Species of frog

Raorchestes primarrumpfi is a species of frog in the family Rhacophoridae. It is endemic to India and has been observed high in the Nilgiri Massif mountains.

This frog lives in montaine grasslands, especially swampy areas. It has been observed between 2212 and 2359 meters above sea level. It can only live in habitats with considerable humidity.

The female frog lays eggs in clumps on blades of grass. Like other frogs in Raorchestes, it breeds through direct development with no free-swimming tadpole stage.

Scientists classify this frog as critically endangered because of its small range, which is subject to ongoing degradation. Scientists cite climate change as the largest threat to this frog because it could alter the monsoon weather that keeps the frog's habitat sufficiently waterlogged. Human beings also convert the grassland to plantations for eucalyptus, wattle, and pine lumber. Tourists visiting nearby national parks leave plastic garbage, and incoming residents to the area have brought domesticated and feral cats, which prey on this frog.

Scientists have found the fungus Batrachochytrium dendrobatidis capable of infecting other frogs in Raorchestes, so they infer it could also infect R. primarrumpfi. Batrachochytrium dendrobatidis causes the fungal disease chytridiomycosis.

Scientists used consider this frog part of Raorchestes tinniens but began to consider them different species in 2010.

== Original description ==
- Vijayakumar SP; Dinesh KP; Prabhu MV; Shanker K (2014). "Lineage delimitation and description of nine new species of bush frogs (Anura: Raochestes, Rhacophoridae) from the Western Ghats escarpment". Zootaxa. 3893: 451–488.
