= Raorchestes thodai =

Conservation status
- Data Deficient (IUCN 3.1)

Scientific classification
- Kingdom: Animalia
- Phylum: Chordata
- Class: Amphibia
- Order: Anura
- Family: Rhacophoridae
- Genus: Raorchestes
- Species: R. thodai

Binomial name
- Raorchestes thodai Zachariah, Dinesh, Kunhikrishnan, Das, Raju, Radhakrishnan, Palot, and Kalesh, 2011

Species of amphibian

Raorchestes thodai or the Thoda bush frog is a species of frog of the genus Raorchestes found in Ooty in the Nilgiris district of the Western Ghats of Tamil Nadu in India. Scientists have observed it in the type locality, 1980 meters above sea level. The species is named after the Thoda tribe who dwell in the region.

Scientists have yet to determine the frog's preferred habitat. They observed it sitting on rocks and shrubs in patches of forest near Ooty town. These areas were separated by plantations for eucalyptus, wattle, and pine. These sightings took place between 1863 and 2465 meters above sea level.

Scientists believe this frog breeds through direct development, like other frogs in Raorchestes, with no free-swimming tadpole stage.

Scientists believe this frog might be synonymous with Raorchestes signatus.

== Original description ==
- Zachariah A; Dinesh KP; Kunhikrishnan E; Das S; Raju DV; Radhakrishnan C; Palot MJ; Kalesh S (2011). "Nine new species of frogs of the genus Raorchestes (Amphibia: Anura: Rhacophoridae) from southern Western Ghats, India". Biosystematica (Excerpt). 5 (1): 25–48.
