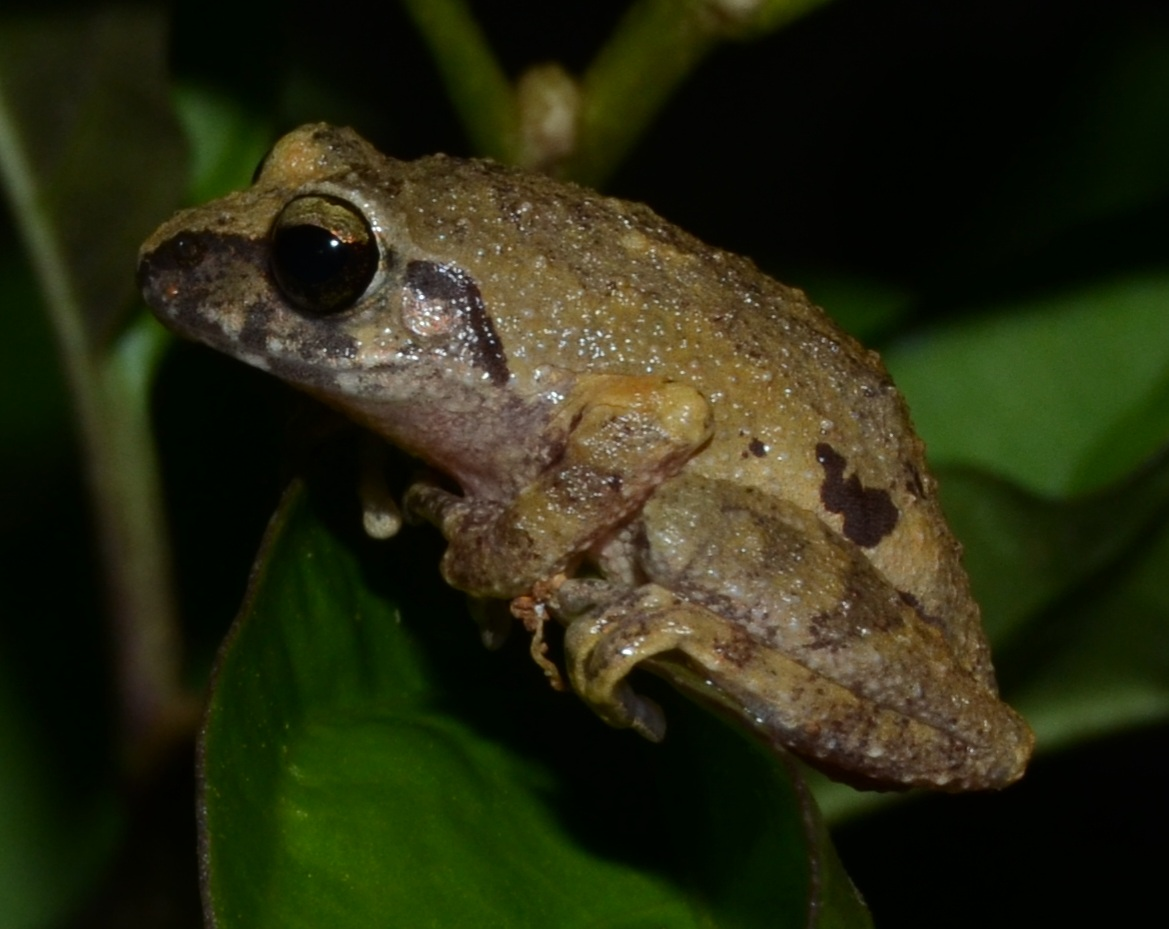
- Roarchestes coonoorensis photographed at Emerald, Ooty

Conservation status
- Endangered (IUCN 3.1)

Scientific classification
- Kingdom: Animalia
- Phylum: Chordata
- Class: Amphibia
- Order: Anura
- Family: Rhacophoridae
- Genus: Raorchestes
- Species: R. coonoorensis

Binomial name
- Raorchestes coonoorensis (Biju and Bossuyt, 2009)

Synonyms
- Philautus coonoorensis Biju and Bossuyt, 2009; Pseudophilautus coonoorensis (Biju and Bossuyt, 2009)

= Raorchestes coonoorensis =

Coonore bushfrog

Species of amphibian

Raorchestes coonoorensis, also known as the Coonore bushfrog or Coonoor bush frog, is a species of frogs endemic to the Western Ghats, India. It is reported from its type locality, Sim's Park in Coonoor (hence its name), with an additional observation from Kothagiri; both locations are in the state of Tamil Nadu. Its altitudinal range is 1,780–1,850 m (5,840–6,070 ft) asl.

== Taxonomy ==
Raorchestes coonoorensis was described in 2009 as Philautus coonoorensis by Sathyabhama Das Biju and Franky Bossuyt (along with 11 other related frogs from the Western Ghats), using both molecular phylogenetics and morphology. Based on molecular data, its closest relatives are Raorchestes charius and Raorchestes griet; it can be readily distinguished from these using morphological features. Later molecular analyses led to moving it from Philautus to Raorchestes.

== Description ==
Raorchestes coonoorensis is a small frog. Only males have been collected; the five males in the type series measure 20.7–23.8 mm (0.81–0.94 in) in snout–vent length. Snout is long (longer than horizontal diameter of the eye) and tympanum is rather distinct. Body is slender and hind-limbs are relatively long. Hands have no webbing but have lateral dermal fringes; toes are slightly webbed. Dorsum bears spinular projections, and much of the dorsal surfaces are shagreened with some granular projections. Upper eyelids are shagreened with some prominent horny spinules, and sides of head are shagreened with prominent tubercles. Dorsum is light-reddish brown, grey, or light-grey, with a light black stripe between the eyes and a pair of brown concave stripes running from behind the eye to the vent. Loreal and tympanic regions are dark-brownish black, and upper and lower jaws have brownish bands alternating with light grey. Both fore and hind-limbs have dark-brownish cross bands. Ventral side is grey with variable-sized dark-brown specks; hands and feet are greyish.

== Habitat and conservation ==
Raorchestes coonoorensis is known from an Eucalyptus plantation and neighbouring disturbed forest. All individuals were collected on leaves, 1–1.5 m above the ground, during rain in the late evening.

It is locally abundant and seems to tolerate some habitat modification; it might also occur more widely than currently known. It has been observed in disturbed forest and near a eucalyptus plantation. This frog can be harmed by pesticides and tourism.
