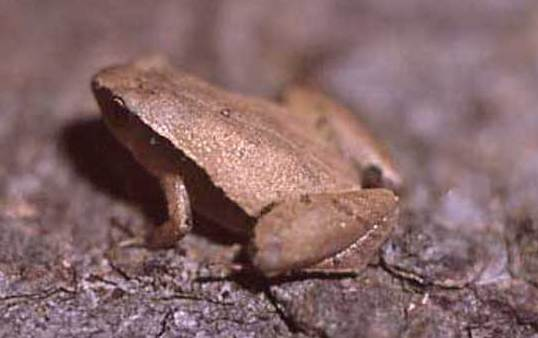

Conservation status
- Least Concern (IUCN 3.1)

Scientific classification
- Kingdom: Animalia
- Phylum: Chordata
- Class: Amphibia
- Order: Anura
- Family: Microhylidae
- Genus: Microhyla
- Species: M. heymonsi

Binomial name
- Microhyla heymonsi Vogt, 1911

= Microhyla heymonsi =

Species of amphibian

Microhyla heymonsi, also known as the dark-sided chorus frog or the Taiwan rice frog, is a species of narrow-mouthed frog found in northeastern India, southern China, Taiwan, and Southeast Asia south to the Malay Peninsula and Sumatra as well as the Great Nicobar Island. It was originally described from Taiwan.

As microhylids in general, Microhyla heymonsi is a small frog: males reach 16–21 mm (0.6–0.8 in) and females 22–26 mm (0.9–1.0 in) in snout-vent length. The dorsal colour is pinkish or greyish above with a black lateral band extending from the snout tip to the groin and entirely covering the sides of the head. It inhabits a variety of disturbed areas as well as secondary vegetation. It breeds in temporary rain puddles, paddy fields, ditches, marshes and slow-flowing streams.

== Photos ==
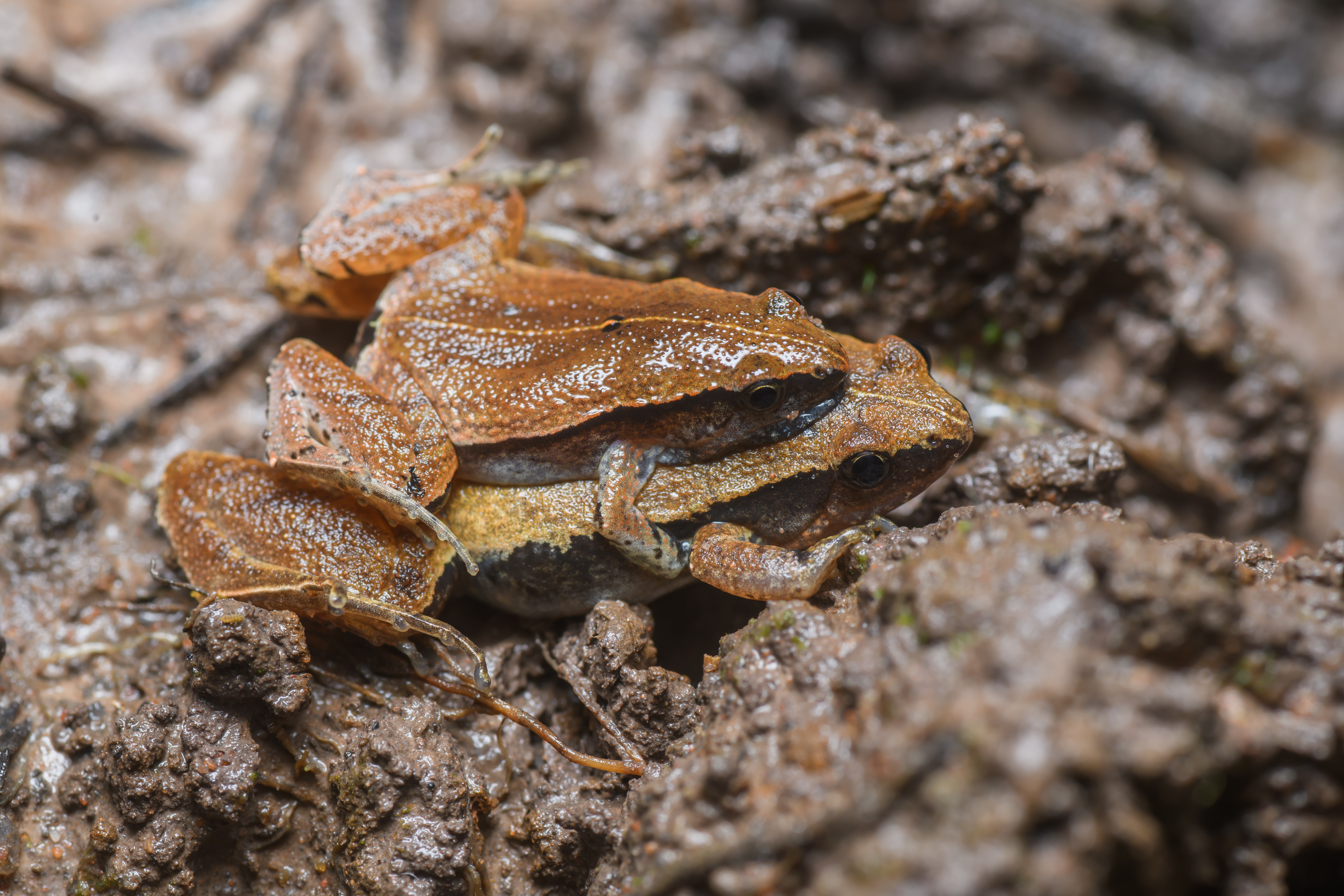
Pair in amplexus – Phu Kradueng National Park
