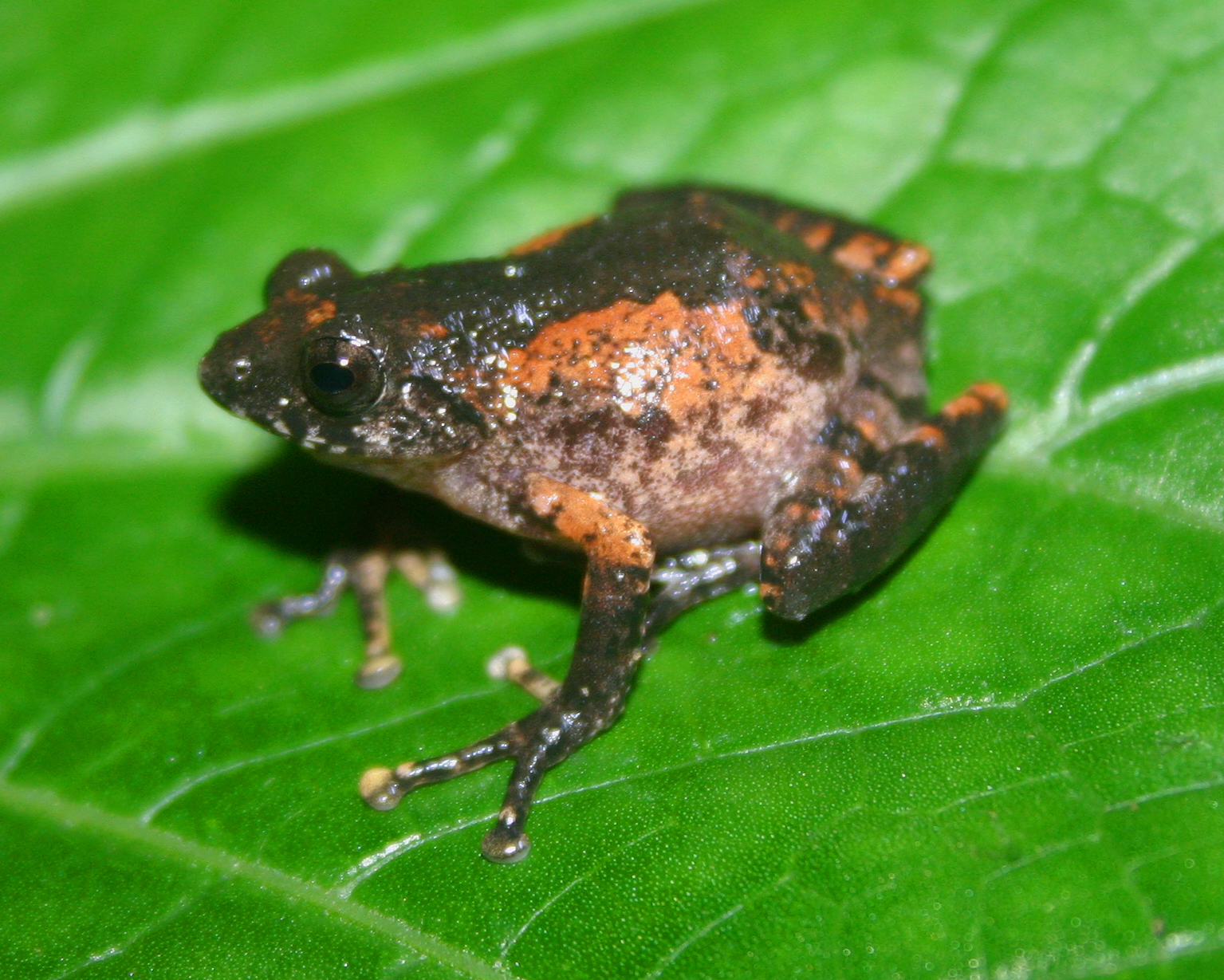

Conservation status
- Critically Endangered (IUCN 3.1)

Scientific classification
- Kingdom: Animalia
- Phylum: Chordata
- Class: Amphibia
- Order: Anura
- Family: Rhacophoridae
- Genus: Raorchestes
- Species: R. marki

Binomial name
- Raorchestes marki (Biju and Bossuyt, 2009)

Synonyms
- Philautus marki Biju and Bossuyt, 2009; Pseudophilautus marki (Biju and Bossuyt, 2009)

= Raorchestes marki =

Mark's bushfrog

Species of amphibian

The Mark's bushfrog (Raorchestes marki) is a critically endangered frog found only in the Nelliampathi Hills within the Western Ghats of Kerala, India. The species is named after Mark Wilkinson of the Natural History Museum, London.

Raorchestes marki are small, slender-bodied frogs. Males measure 21–23 mm (0.83–0.91 in) in snout–vent length and females 28–30 mm (1.1–1.2 in). The dorsum is dark grey and has a brownish concave stripe running from behind the eye.

Like other frogs in Raorchestes, this frog breeds through direct development with no free-swimming tadpole stage.

This frog is classified as critically endangered because its small range is subject to ongoing degradation associated with agriculture, tourism infrastructure, and industrialization.
