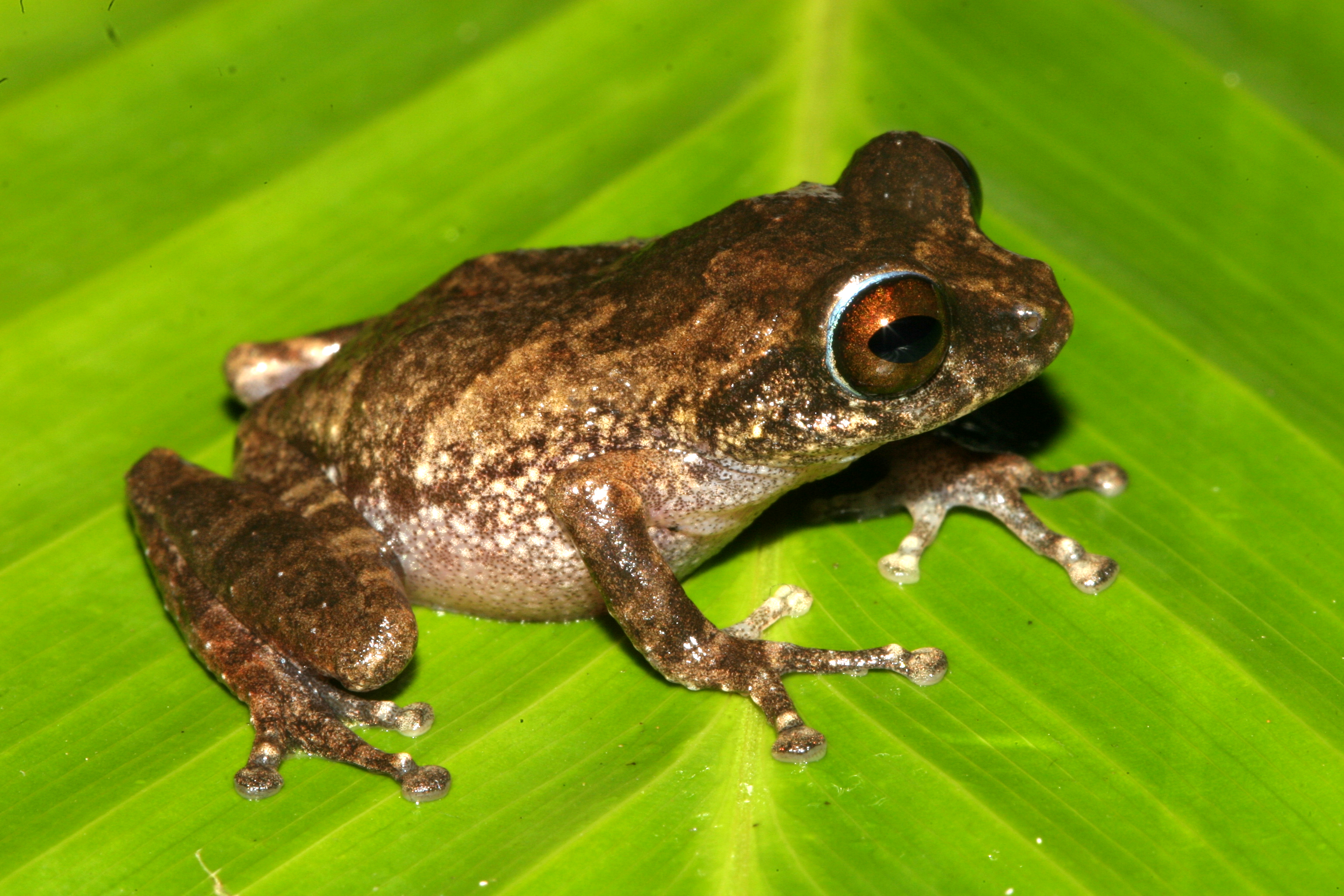

Conservation status
- Endangered (IUCN 3.1)

Scientific classification
- Kingdom: Animalia
- Phylum: Chordata
- Class: Amphibia
- Order: Anura
- Family: Rhacophoridae
- Genus: Raorchestes
- Species: R. kaikatti

Binomial name
- Raorchestes kaikatti (Biju & Bossuyt, 2009)

Synonyms
- Philautus kaikatti Biju and Bossuyt, 2009

= Raorchestes kaikatti =

Species of amphibian

Raorchestes kaikatti, sometimes known as the Kaikatti bushfrog or Kaikatt's bush frog, is an endangered frogs found in the Nelliampathi Hills within the Western Ghats of Kerala, India. The species is named after Kaikatti, its type locality.

Raorchestes kaikatti are small (but medium-sized in Raorchestes terms), relatively robust-bodied frogs. Males measure 23–26 mm (0.91–1.02 in) in snout–vent length (the type series did not include any females). The dorsum is dark greyish brown with irregular light-grey and dark-brown blotches. There is a dark horizontal grey band in between the eyes.

Scientists named this frog for the place where it was found, Kaikatti. Later surveys showed the frog to be present in small patches of evergreen forest, where it could be found in the canopy, as high as 5 meters above the ground. It was also observed on coffee plantations and other farms near forests.

Scientists classify this frog as endangered because of its small, threatened range and inferred low tolerance to habitat disturbance. Its habitat is subject to continued deforestation associated with small-scale agriculture and the construction of tourism infrastructure.
