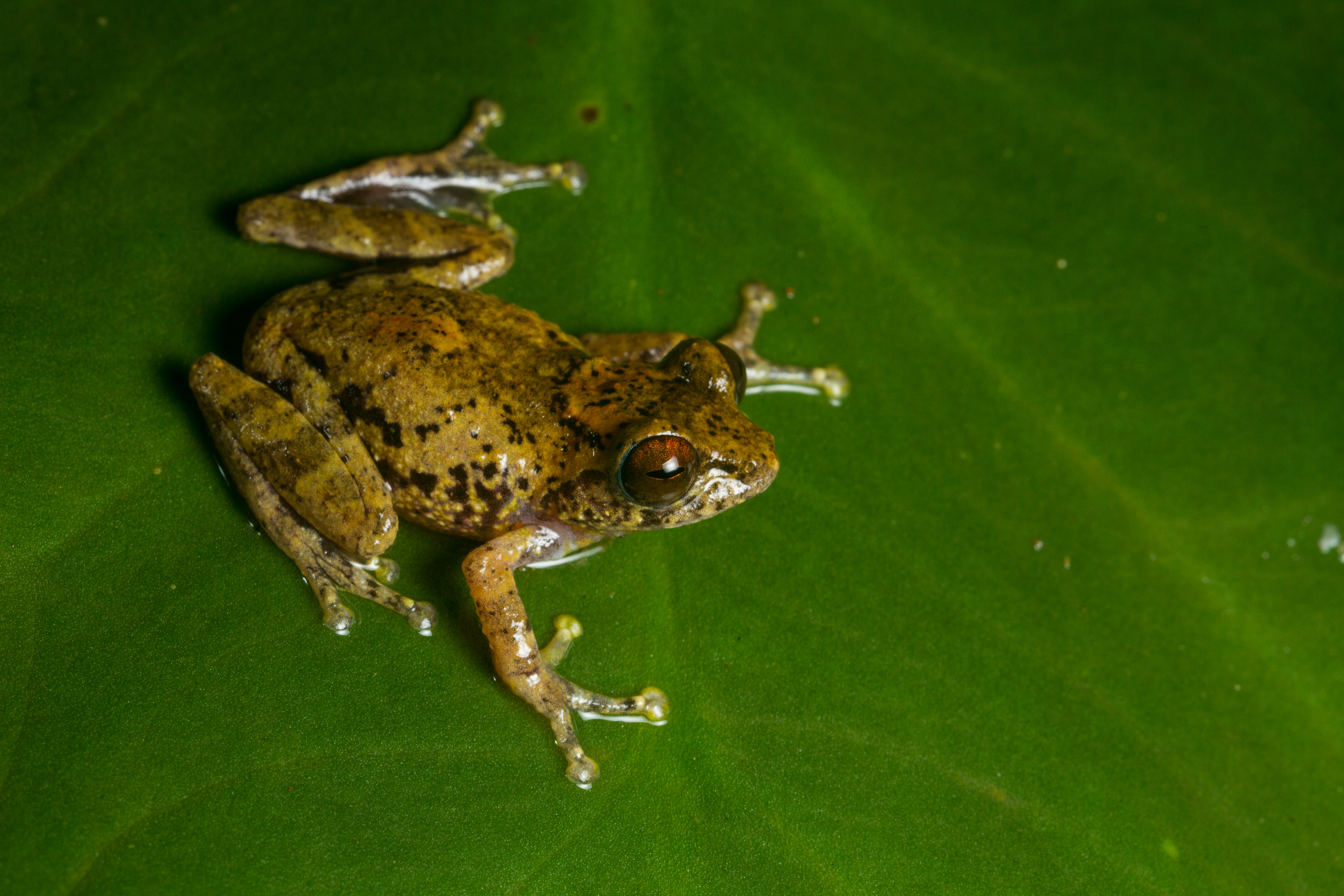

Conservation status
- Endangered (IUCN 3.1)

Scientific classification
- Kingdom: Animalia
- Phylum: Chordata
- Class: Amphibia
- Order: Anura
- Family: Rhacophoridae
- Genus: Raorchestes
- Species: R. sushili

Binomial name
- Raorchestes sushili Biju & Bossuyt, 2009

Synonyms
- Philautus sushili; Pseudophilautus sushili

= Raorchestes sushili =

Sushil's Bushfrog

Species of amphibian

Sushil's bushfrog (Raorchestes sushili) is a critically endangered frog found only in the Andiparai Shola in the municipality of Valparai in Coimbatore district, Tamil Nadu, India.

This frog has been observed in evergreen forests between 1000 and 1600 meters above sea level. The frog sits on leaves and stems 1–3 m above the ground. This frog has not bene found in disturbed habitats, per a 2023 IUCN report.

Like other frogs in Raorchestes, this frog breeds through direct development.

The IUCN classifies this frog as endangered because of its small, fragmented range, which is subject to ongoing degradation.

== Original description ==
- Biju SD; Bossuyt F (2009). "Systematics and phylogeny of Philautus Gistel, 1848 (Anura, Rhacophoridae) in the Western Ghats of India, with descriptions of 12 new species". Zool J Linn Soc (Abstract). 155: 374–444.
