= Amolops nepalicus =

Conservation status
- Data Deficient (IUCN 3.1)

Scientific classification
- Kingdom: Animalia
- Phylum: Chordata
- Class: Amphibia
- Order: Anura
- Family: Ranidae
- Genus: Amolops
- Species: A. nepalicus

Binomial name
- Amolops nepalicus Yang, 1991

Species of frog

Amolops nepalicus is a species of frog in the family Ranidae. It is endemic to Nepal and is only known from two localities in the Sankhuwasabha District. Common names Nepal sucker frog and Nepal cascade frog have been proposed for it.

== Taxonomy ==
First described in 1991, Amolops nepalicus was brought into synonymy of Amolops marmoratus by works published in 2000–2004. This synonymy was questioned in 2012, but only formally rejected in 2020.

== Description ==
Adult males measure 36–47 mm (1.4–1.9 in) and adult females 45–79 mm (1.8–3.1 in) in snout–vent length. The head is slightly longer than it is wide. The tympanum is distinct. The fingers have no webbing while the toes are fully webbed. There are few rounded tubercles scattered on the dorsum whereas the belly is smooth; the dorsolateral fold is indistinct. The dorsal coloration is light brown or white with dark brown spots. Males have an external vocal sac.

== Habitat and conservation ==
Amolops nepalicus is a semi-aquatic frog that inhabits torrential streams with high canopy cover at elevations of 670–848 m (2,198–2,782 ft) above sea level. Threats to this poorly known species are not known. It is not known to present in any protected area.
