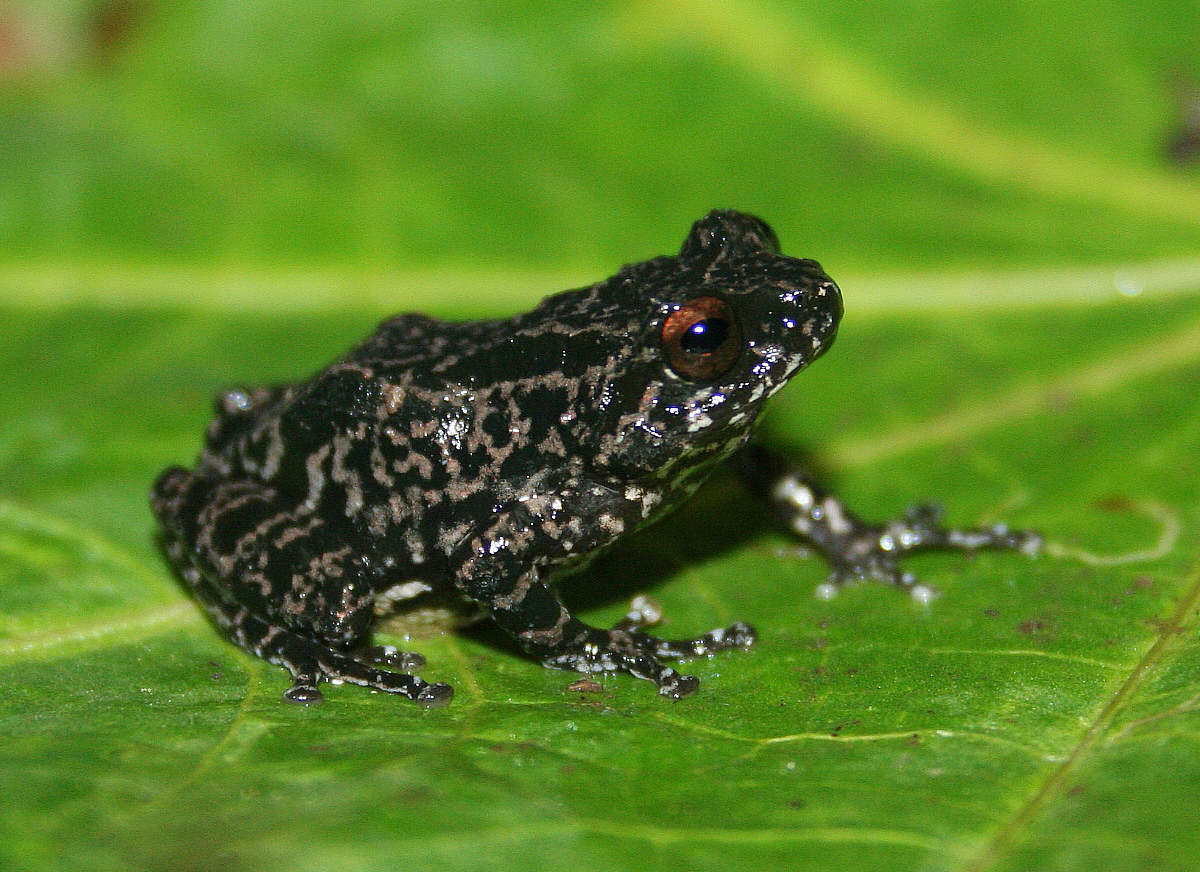

Conservation status
- Least Concern (IUCN 3.1)

Scientific classification
- Kingdom: Animalia
- Phylum: Chordata
- Class: Amphibia
- Order: Anura
- Family: Rhacophoridae
- Genus: Raorchestes
- Species: R. ghatei

Binomial name
- Raorchestes ghatei Padhye, Sayyed, Jadhav, and Dahanukar, 2013

= Raorchestes ghatei =

Species of amphibian

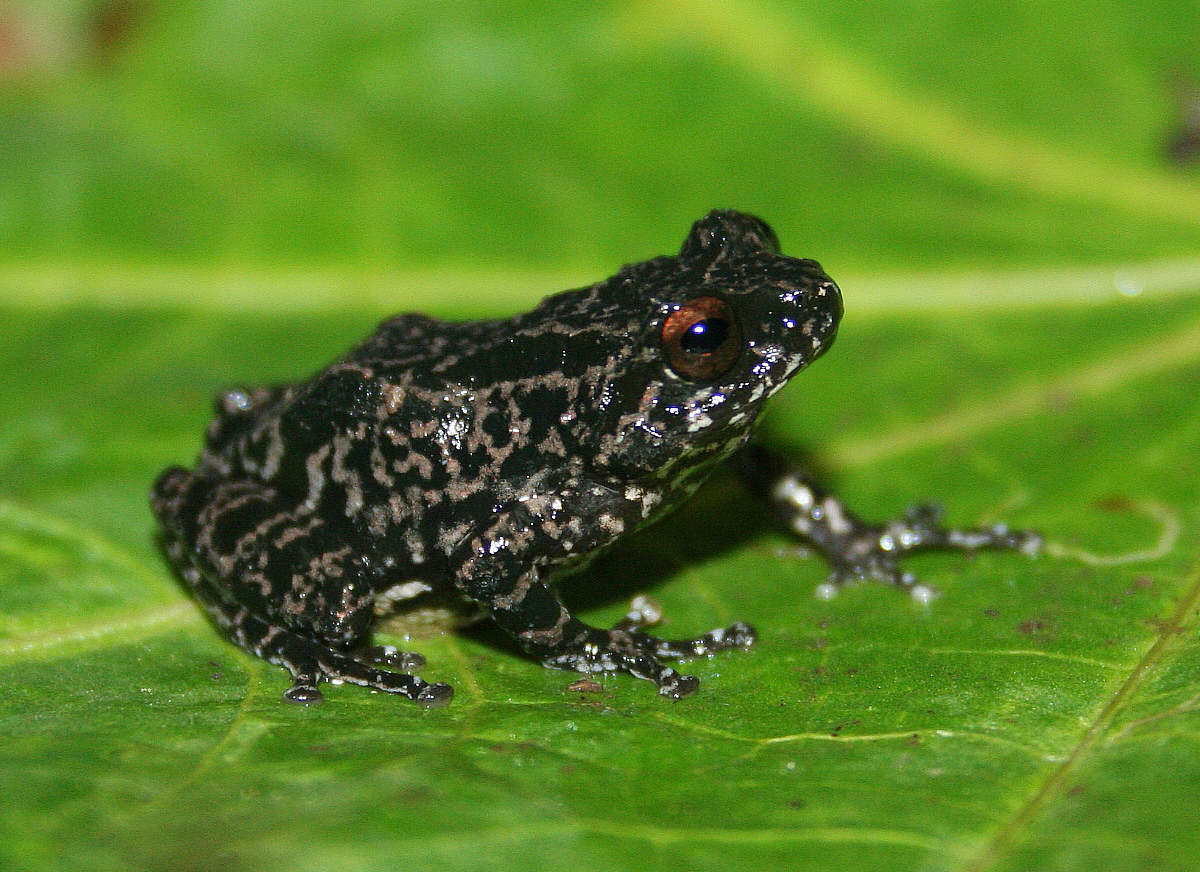
Raorchestes ghatei

Raorchestes ghatei (common name: Ghate's shrub frog) is a species of shrub frogs from the Western Ghats of Maharashtra.

== Appearance ==
The adult male frog measures about 9.1–25.5 mm in snout-vent length and the adult female frog about 15.4–29.8 mm. The adult male frog and adult female frog show visible sexual dimorphism in their coloration. The skin of the adult female frog's dorsum is dark in color with light patterns and black stripes from the eardrum to the groin. There are black stripes on the front and hind legs. The middle of the body is cream-white in color and yellow-orange nearer to the legs. The skin of the adult male frog's back is dark brown in color with black stripes from the eardrum to groin. The front legs are dark in color with no stripes. The back legs have spots. The middle of the body is cream-white in color. The adult male frog has a tubercule spike on his arm bone.

The species differs from its congeners based on a combination of characters including small to medium-sized adult males, snout mucronate in dorsal view, canthus rostralis angular and sharp, snout slightly projecting beyond mouth ventrally, tympanum indistinct and one third of the eye diameter, tongue without papilla but with a lingual pit, nuptial pad rudimentary to absent, a bony tubercle on humerus at the end of deltoid ridge present in males and absent in females, skin finely granulated or smooth dorsally, lateral side marbled with white blotches on brown to black background. Molecular phylogeny based on 16S rRNA gene sequence suggests that the new species is genetically distinct and forms a monophyletic clade within Raorchestes. The species exhibits sexual dimorphism with males having single sub-gular vocal sac and a tubercle on the humerus while females lack them. The species shows direct development. The species is widely distributed in the Western Ghats of Maharashtra.

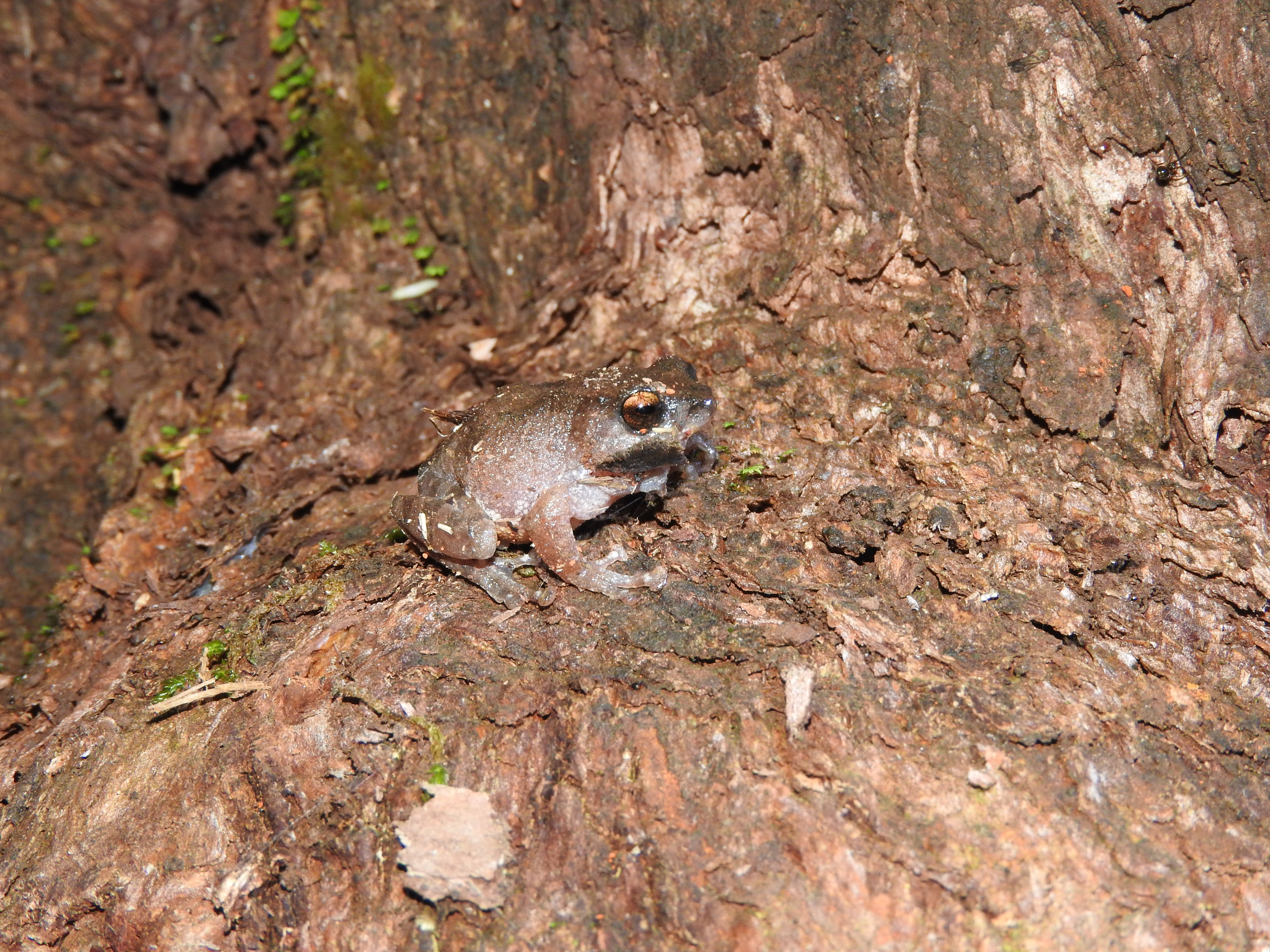
Raorchestes ghatei

== Life cycle ==
The adult male frog chooses a place near the ground to sit and then sings for the female frogs. Sometimes male frogs fight over good perches. After a strong male frog wins a fight, the other male frog either leaves or ceases to sing. Scientists have seen R. ghatei attempt to mate with frogs of other species, such as Microhyla ornata or Uperodon mormorata.

The female frog lays 40–60 eggs per clutch under a rock or in leaf litter on the ground. If she lays the eggs before monsoon season, she leaves, providing no further care. But if she lays the eggs after monsoon season, she remains nearby to guard them. The eggs hatch if the temperature remains within an amenable range: 20-22 °C. The eggs take 21–30 days to hatch. This frog undergoes direct development, hatching as a small froglet with no free-swimming tadpole stage.

== Diet and predators ==
Adult frogs eat insects and other arthropods. Younger frogs eat mosquitoes and other insects. Snakes such as the bamboo pitviper and saw-scaled viper, lizards such as the forest lizard and changeable lizard, and birds such as the white-throated kingfisher will all prey upon this frog.

== Threats ==
Scientists classify this frog as at least concern of extinction because of its large range. However, because of habitat loss, they recommend the population be monitored. Humans cut down trees to get wood to build things and to make room for farms. Scientists also saw that a fungus that causes the disease chytridiomycosis can make this frog sick.
