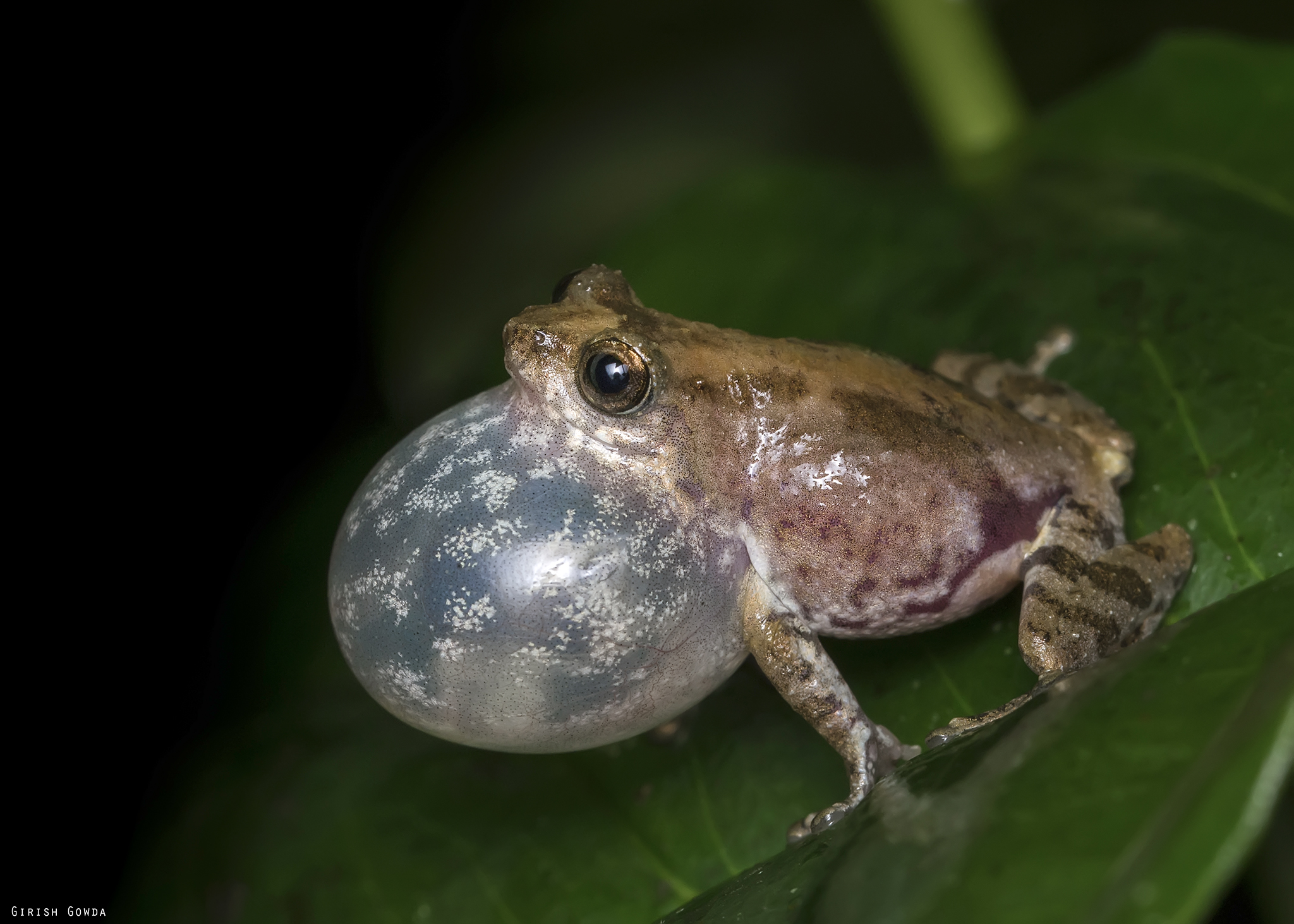

Conservation status
- Least Concern (IUCN 3.1)

Scientific classification
- Kingdom: Animalia
- Phylum: Chordata
- Class: Amphibia
- Order: Anura
- Family: Rhacophoridae
- Genus: Raorchestes
- Species: R. tuberohumerus

Binomial name
- Raorchestes tuberohumerus (Kuramoto & Joshy, 2003)

Synonyms
- Philautus tuberohumerus Kuramoto & Joshy, 2003

= Raorchestes tuberohumerus =

Species of frog

Raorchestes tuberohumerus (Kudremukh bush frog or knob handed shrub frog) is a species of frog in the family Rhacophoridae. It is endemic to the Western Ghats, India, where it is found in Karnataka and Kerala states.

== Description ==
This small sized shrub frog (male snout-vent length 22–19 mm (0.87–0.75 in)) is diagnosed by the following combination of characters: Snout sub elliptical in shape; iris golden brown; the humerus bone slightly projects on the ventral region near shoulders; light grey dorsum with spinular projections and prominent yellow patches with brown on the groin region.

== Ecology and natural history ==
Raorchestes tuberohumerus are seen on shrubs in forests, plantations, home gardens and road side vegetation between 500 and 1500 m elevation. They are known to face down towards ground and vocalize on dead leaves on shrubs.

== Etymology ==
Scientists believe this is the only frog whose humerus bone sticks out of its body, so they gave it the Latin name tuberohumerus, meaning "knobbed humerus bone."

== Threats ==
Scientists classify this frog as least concern of extinction. What danger it faces is from wholesale conversion of its habitat to farmland or conversion from farmland compatible with its lifestyle to farmland incompatible with its lifestyle, such as ginger farming and other cash crops. Scientists also cite climate change as a danger for this frog.

Scientists believe the fungus Batrachochytrium dendrobatidis can infect this frog. Batrachochytrium dendrobatidis causes the fungal disease chytridiomycosis.

== Current known localities ==
Wayanad, Muthanga, Madikeri, Kudremukh, Agumbe, Jog, Kempholey, Anashi, Sakleshpur

== Gallery ==
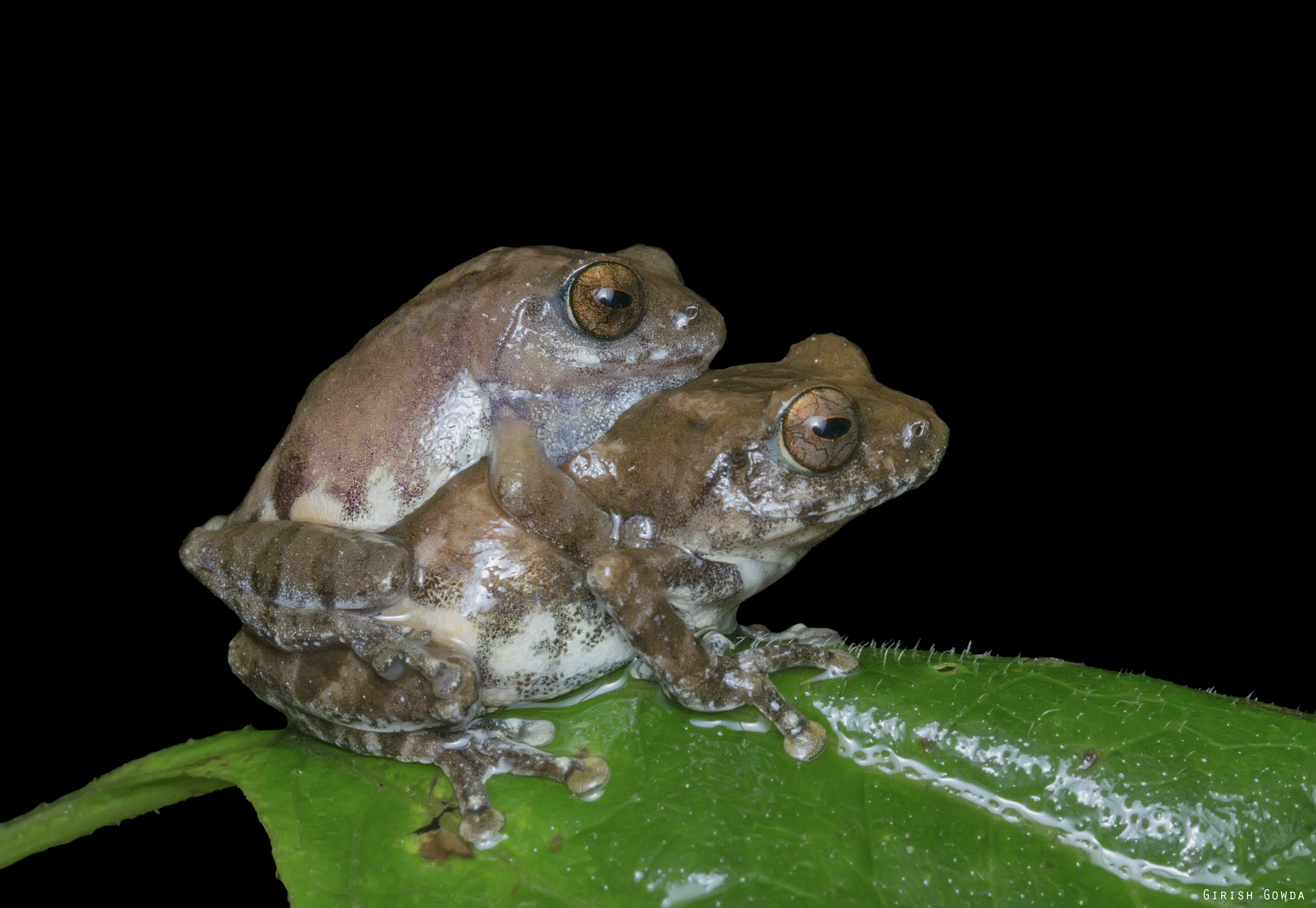
Raorchestes tuberohumerus in amplexus from agumbe

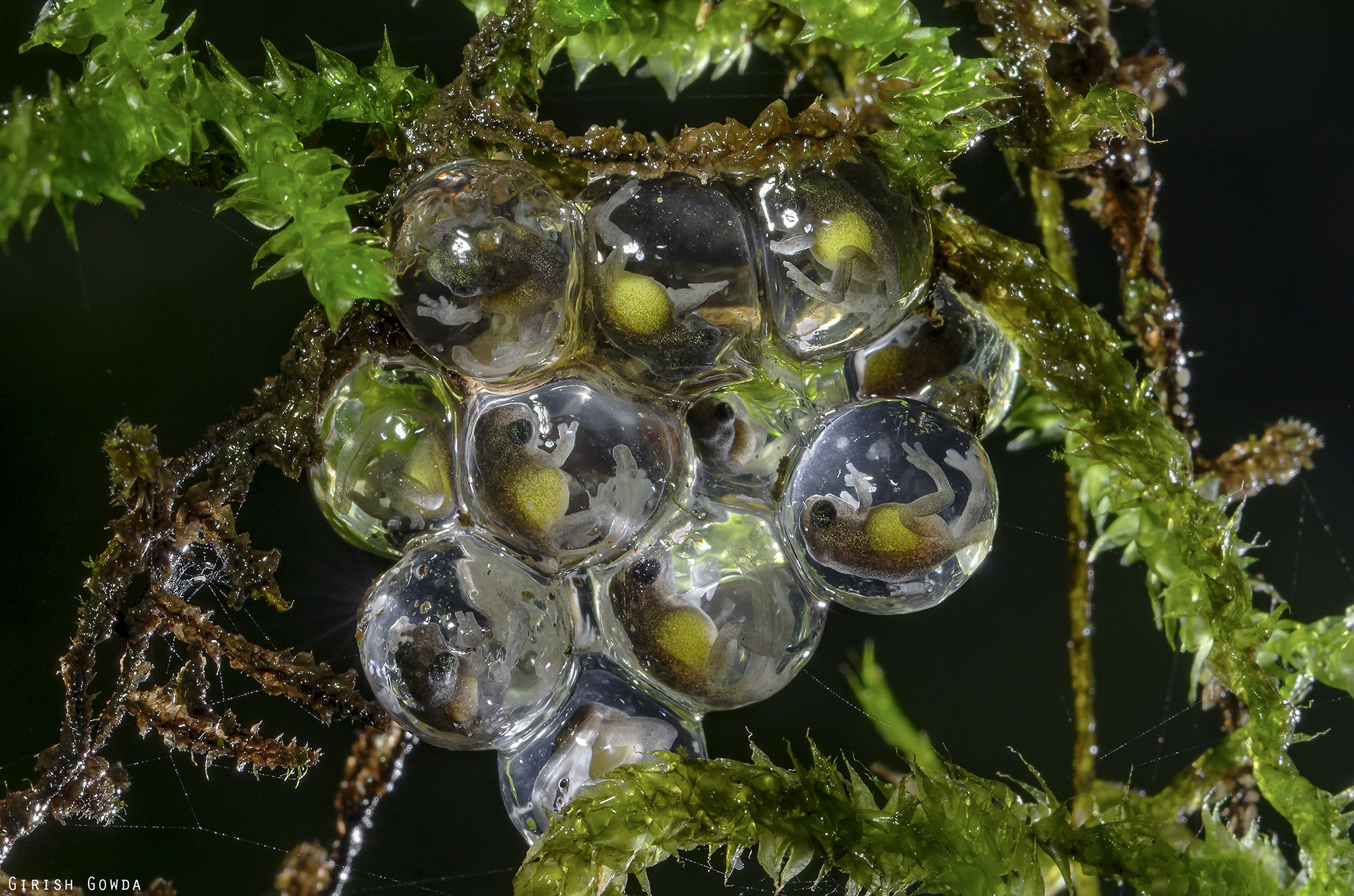
Raorchestes tuberohumerus eggs laid in moss

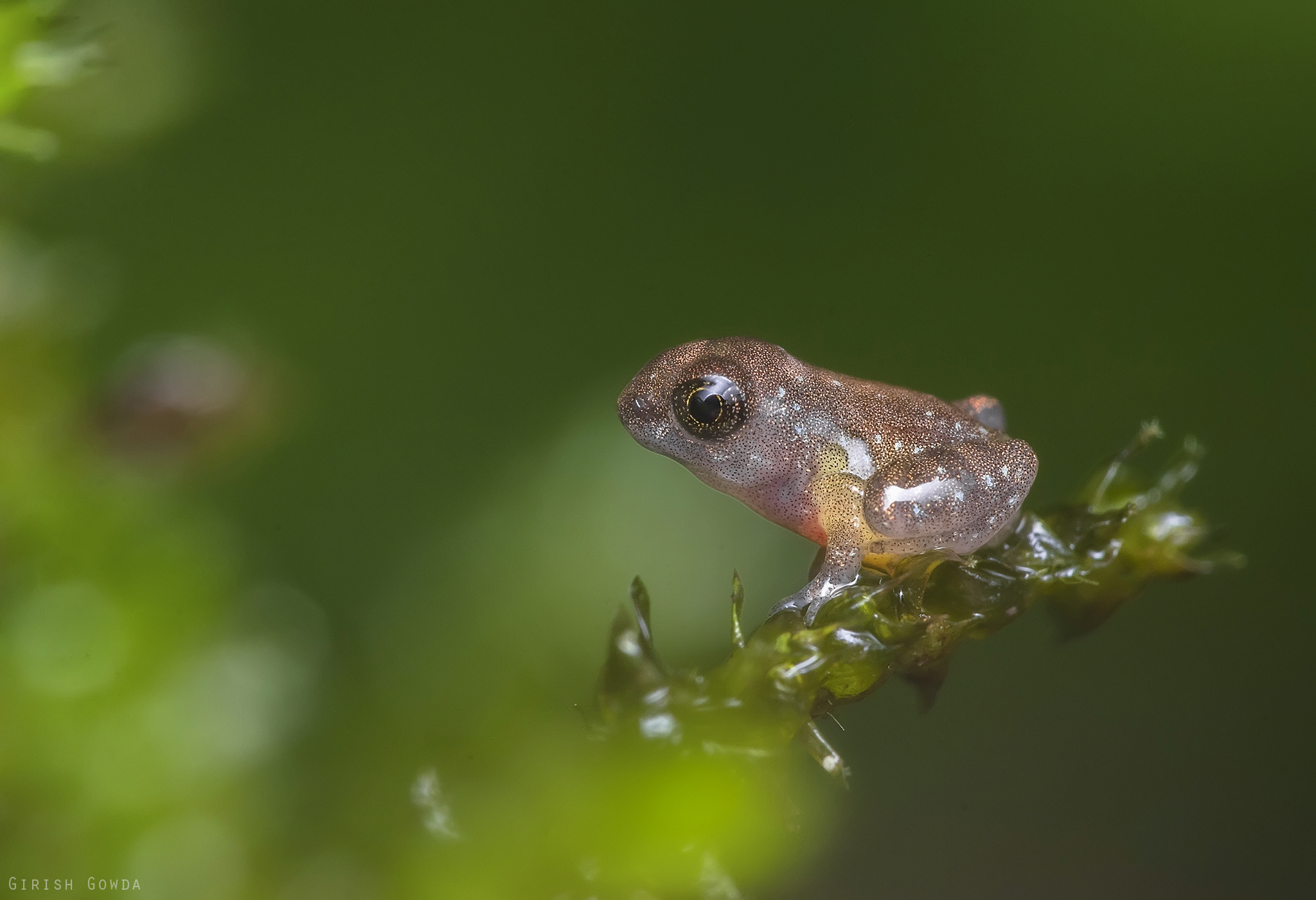
Freshly hatched froglet

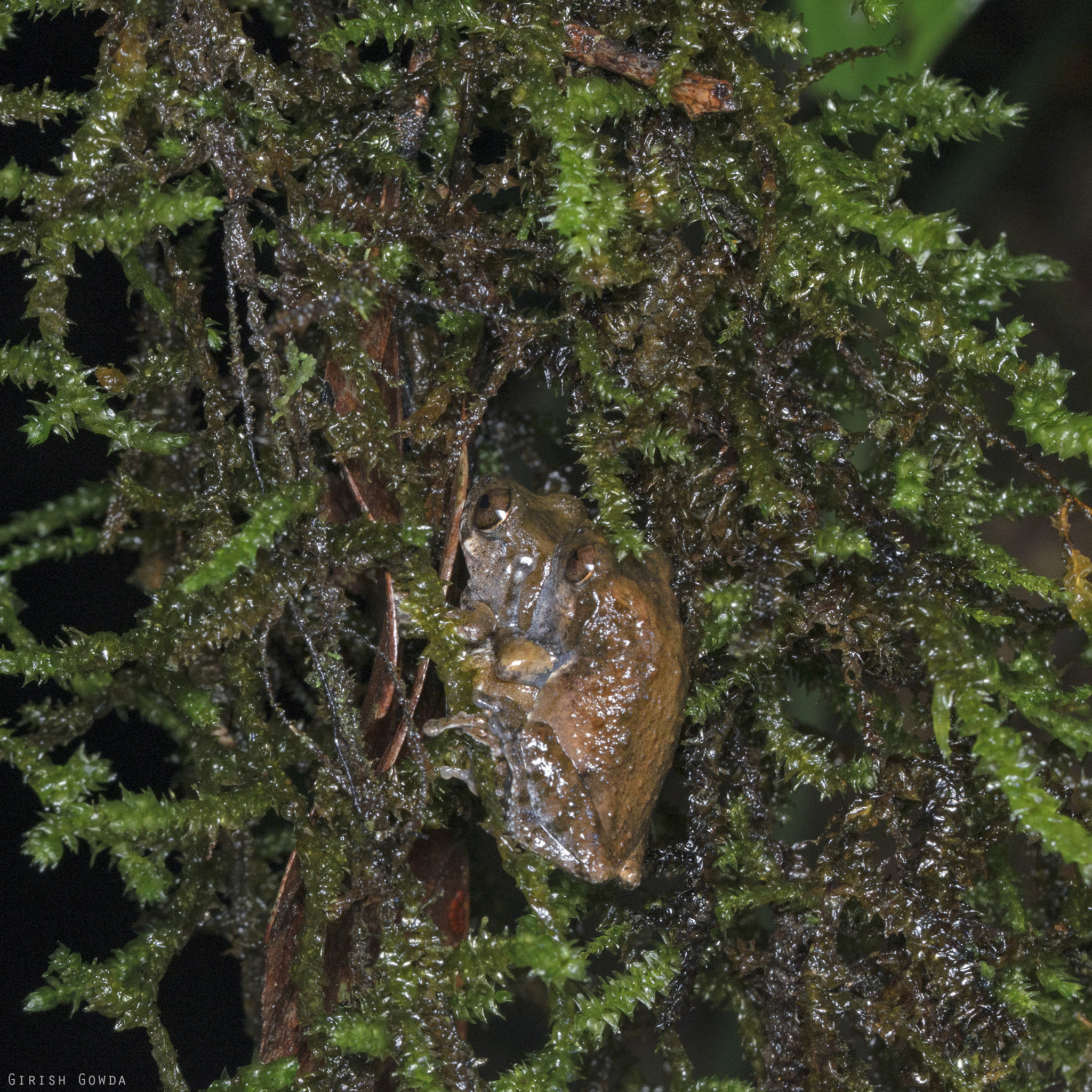
