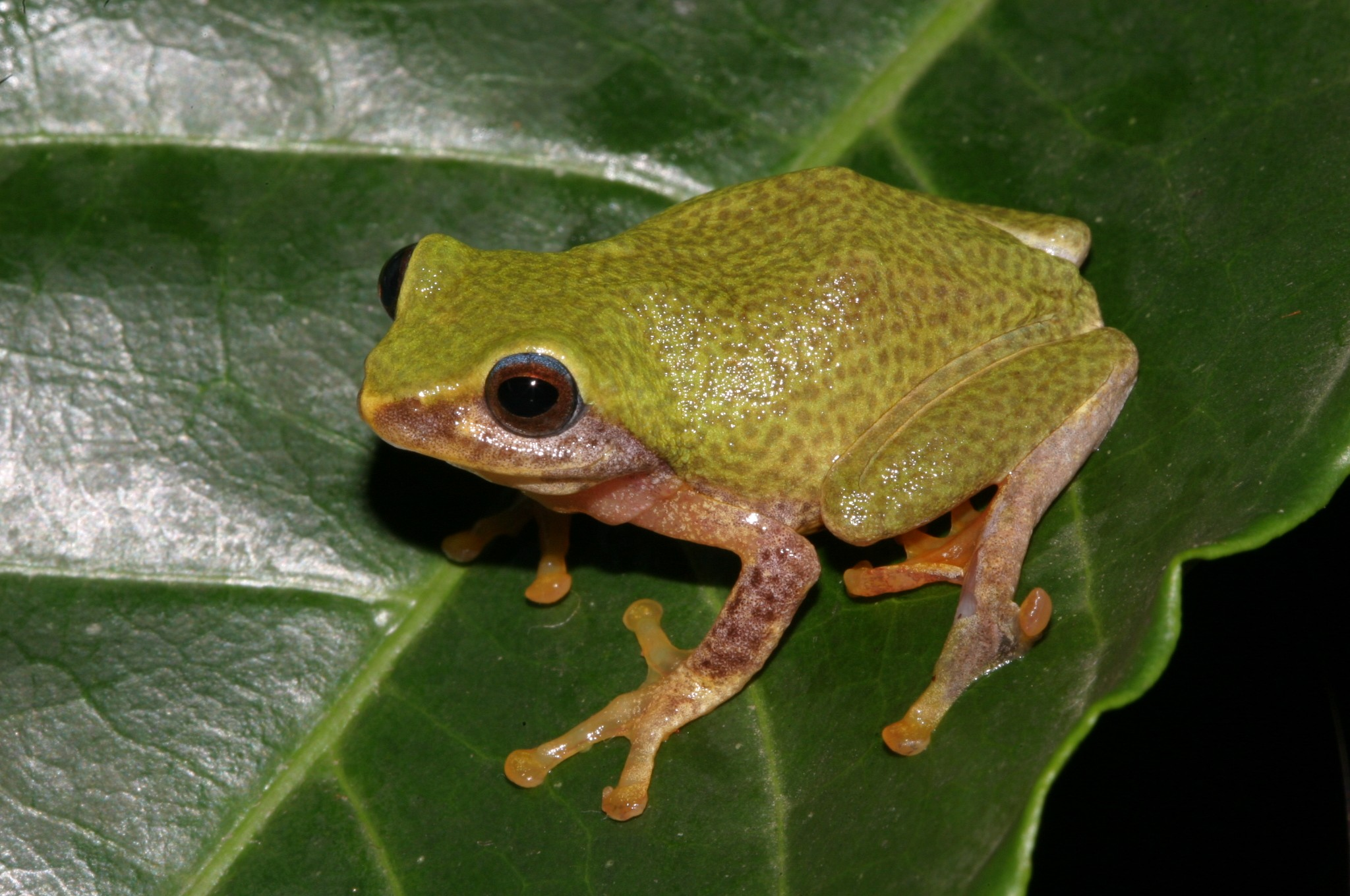

Conservation status
- Vulnerable (IUCN 3.1)

Scientific classification
- Kingdom: Animalia
- Phylum: Chordata
- Class: Amphibia
- Order: Anura
- Family: Rhacophoridae
- Genus: Raorchestes
- Species: R. glandulosus

Binomial name
- Raorchestes glandulosus (Jerdon, 1853)

Synonyms
- Ixalis ? glandulosa Jerdon, 1853; Ixalus glandulosa – Jerdon, 1870; Ixalus glandulosus – Günther, 1876 "1875"; Ixalus pulcher Boulenger, 1882; Rhacophorus noblei Ahl, 1927; Rhacophorus pulcherrimus Ahl, 1927; Philautus glandulosus – Roux, 1928; Rhacophorus (Philautus) glandulosus – Ahl, 1931; Rhacophorus (Philautus) noblei – Ahl, 1931; Rhacophorus (Philautus) pulcherrimus – Ahl, 1931; Philautus pulcher – Rao, 1937; Philautus noblei – Gorham, 1974; Philautus pulcherrimus – Gorham, 1974; Philautus (Philautus) glandulosus – Bossuyt and Dubois, 2001; Pseudophilautus glandulosus – Li et al., 2009; Raorchestes glandulosus – Biju et al., 2010

= Raorchestes glandulosus =

Species of amphibian

Raorchestes glandulosus, also known as glandular bush frog, rough-skinned bush frog, southern bubble-nest frog, and with many other names, is a species of frog in the family Rhacophoridae. It is endemic to the Western Ghats, India, and known from the states of Karnataka and Kerala.

== Description ==
The distinguishing feature of this species, at least among the Raorchestes from the Western Ghats, is its yellow dorsal surface of the forearm and the loreal region. Raorchestes glandulosus are small frogs. Males are 22–27 mm (0.87–1.06 in) in snout-vent length. Among the generally small Raorchestes, this makes them medium-sized. The holotype, now lost, was about 31 mm (1.2 in). The snout is pointed. The dorsum is shagreened. The lateral abdominal area is prominently glandular (hence the specific name glandulosus). Dorsal coloration varies between individuals and environmental conditions between dark green to dark purple or violet. The sides, forelimbs, and the loreal and tympanic regions are yellow. The ventrum is yellow to light yellow.

== Habitat and threats ==
Raorchestes glandulosus has been observed between 400 and 2000 meters above sea level. It is an arboreal species, usually found higher that 4 metres above the ground. It can be found within rainforest but also disturbed habitats such as forest fringes near coffee plantations and gardens. Raorchestes glandulosus is threatened by habitat loss. The frog's range includes protected parks: Rajiv Gandhi National Park and Silent Valley National Park.

The frog is classified as vulnerable to extinction because of habitat loss from the construction of plantations and roads. Scientists also cite climate change as a threat to this frog given that it could make the forests too dry for the frog to thrive. Given that many of the frogs live at high elevations, they would not be able to migrate to new places naturally should the climate grow hotter. Other frogs in Roarchestes have shown morbidity from chytridiomycosis, but scientists are not certain that it also kills R. glandulosus.
