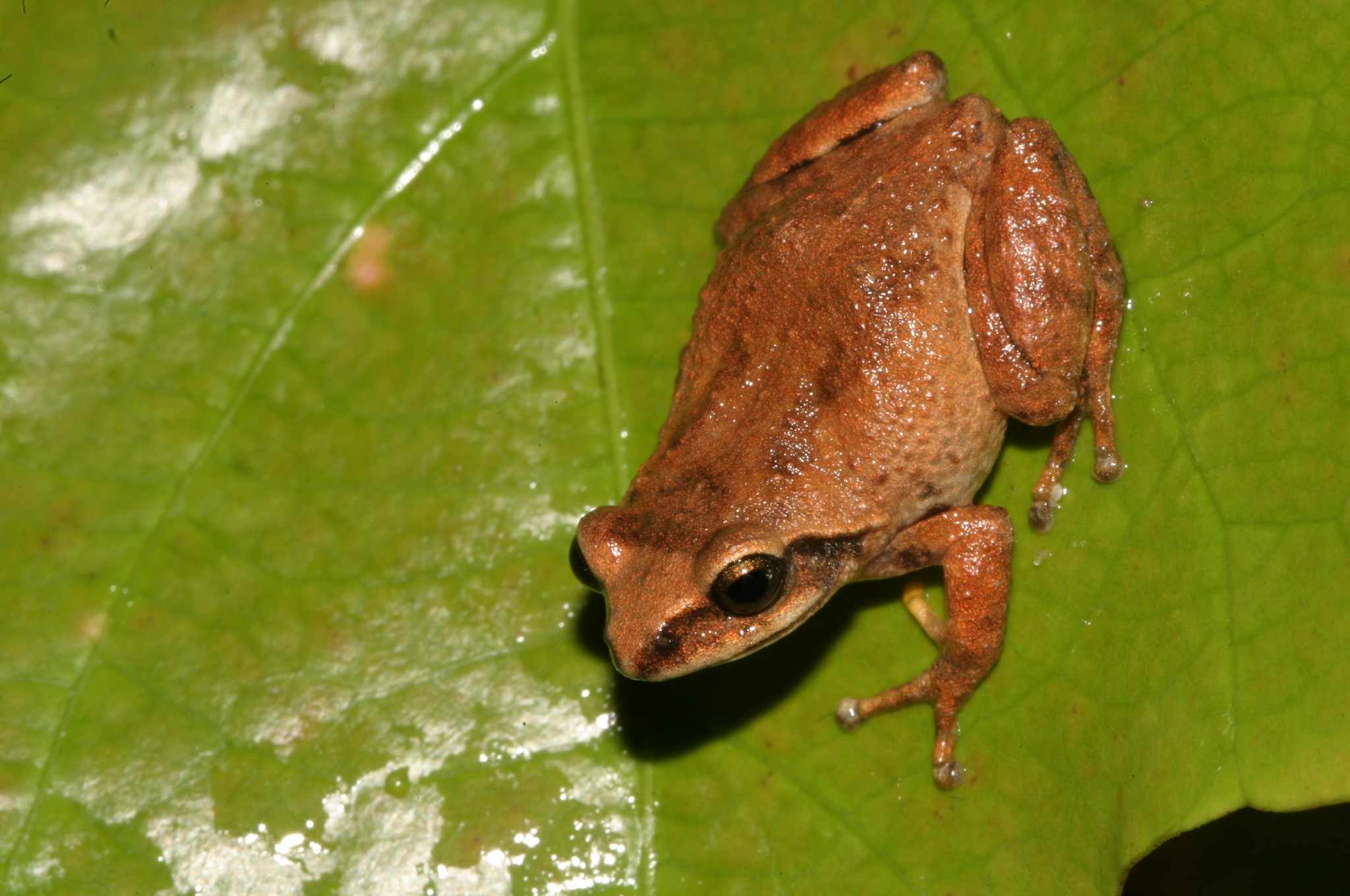
- Raorchestes tinniens

Conservation status
- Endangered (IUCN 3.1)

Scientific classification
- Kingdom: Animalia
- Phylum: Chordata
- Class: Amphibia
- Order: Anura
- Family: Rhacophoridae
- Genus: Raorchestes
- Species: R. tinniens

Binomial name
- Raorchestes tinniens (Jerdon, 1853)

Synonyms
- Phyllomedusa ? tinniens Jerdon, 1853; Ixalus tinniens — Jerdon, 1870; Philautus (Philautus) tinniens — Bossuyt and Dubois, 2001; Pseudophilautus tinniens — Li et al., 2009; Raorchestes tinniens — Biju et al., 2010; Ixalus punctatus Anderson, 1871; Philautus punctatus — Boulenger, 1890; Ixalus montanus Günther, 1876; Philautus melanensis Rao, 1937

= Raorchestes tinniens =

Species of frog

Raorchestes tinniens, also known as the spotted bush frog, black bush frog, tinkling Nilgiri bush frog, tinkling Nilgiri bush frog, and Rao's bubble-nest frog (the latter two referring to species now considered junior synonyms of R. tinniens), is a species of frog in the family Rhacophoridae. It is endemic to the Nilgiri Hills, a part of the Western Ghats, in Tamil Nadu and Kerala, southern India. It has a rather complicated taxonomic history, and there is still an open issue whether Ixalus montanus Günther, 1876 from Kudremukh (Karnataka), now in synonymy with Raorchestes tinniens, is indeed a valid species.

== Description ==
Male Raorchestes tinniens measure about 18–22 mm (0.71–0.87 in) in snout-vent length of and females 25–28 mm (0.98–1.10 in). Dorsum is grey–brown and iris is dark-blackish brown. Flanks and groin are dark-brownish black, and belly is coarsely granular. "Ixalus montanus" from Kudremukh are larger, mean size for males and females being 29 mm (1.1 in) and 36 mm (1.4 in), respectively. They are also yellowish brown (instead dark brown) in their flanks and groin.

== Distribution and habitat ==
Raorchestes tinniens is known from the Nilgiri Hills and surroundings. It is a terrestrial species found on the ground or low in the vegetation. It is associated with montane tropical moist evergreen forests, but can also be found in grasslands and modified areas close to forests. It is a common species within its distribution area, but it is threatened by habitat loss and believed to be declining. Scientists have seen it between 1700 and 2465 meters above sea level.

== Reproduction ==
Males call even during the daytime. Raorchestes tinniens has direct development (i.e., there is no free-living larval stage). Eggs are laid in a hole in a ground. Froglets hatch after about 19 days.

== Threats ==
The IUCN classifies this frog as endangered because of its small range, which is subject to considerable habitat loss.

People convert the frog's forest habitat to build plantations for eucalyptus, wattle, and pine and to build homes and grazing areas for cattle. Pesticides and herbicides can also kill this frog. Tourists to the hills can frighten this frog and leave garbage behind.

Scientists cite climate change as another threat to this frog. This has altered the monsoon pattern in its habitat, which causes further issues, including landslides. Because the frog lives at high elevations, it cannot readily migrate to cooler habitats.

Scientists have noted the fungus Batrachochytrium dendrobatidis on other frogs in Raorchestes. Batrachochytrium dendrobatidis causes the fungal disease chytridiomycosis.

Scientists have noted some frogs with deformed bodies and cite ultraviolet radiation as a possible cause.

The bronze-headed vine snake and Horsfield's spiny lizard prey upon this frog. Humans who have moved to areas near the frog's habitat brought domestic cats with them, which prey upon this frog.

== Taxonomy ==
Scientists believe R. tinniens may be conspecific with Raorchestes punctatus, and R. melanensis.
