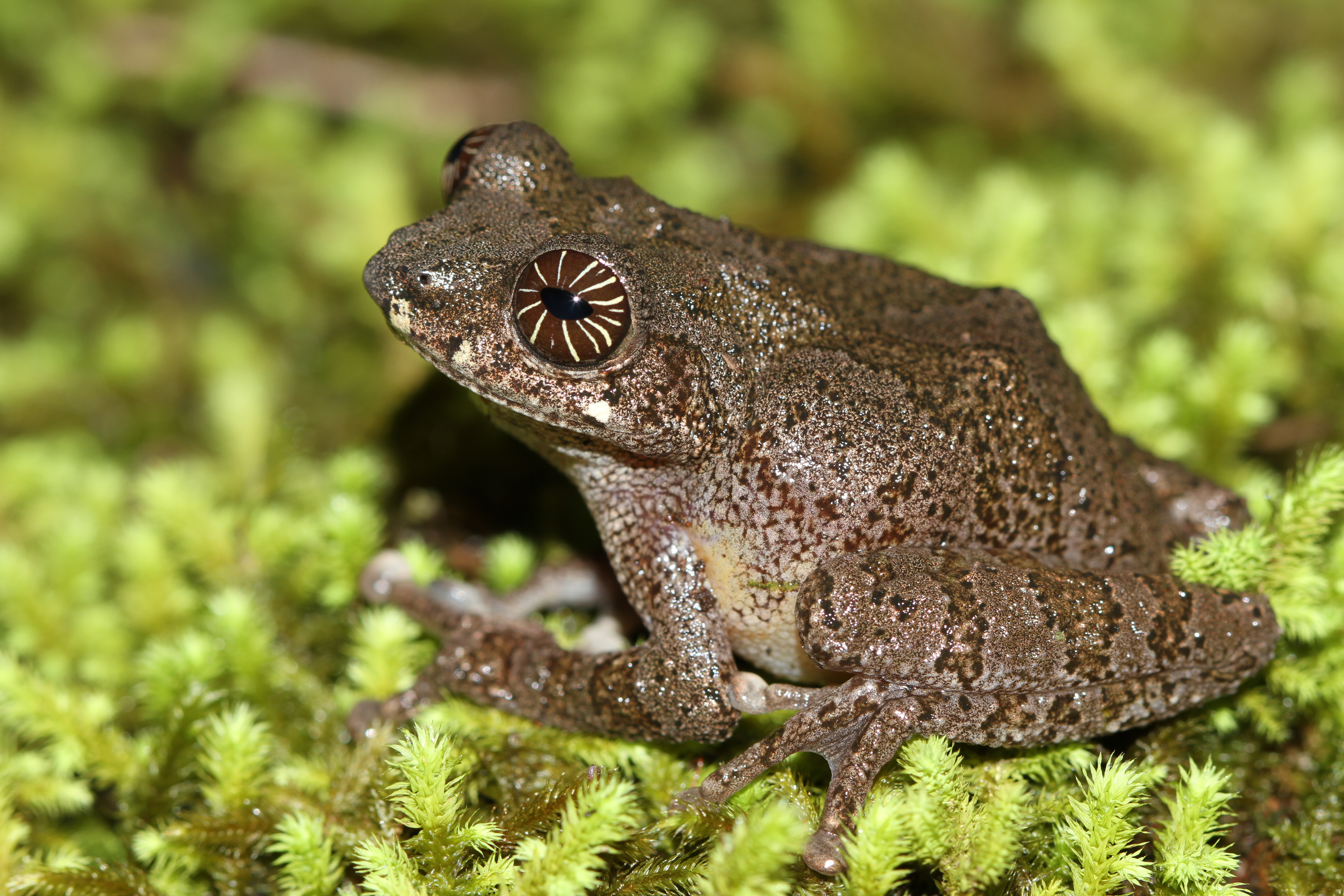

Conservation status
- Endangered (IUCN 3.1)

Scientific classification
- Kingdom: Animalia
- Phylum: Chordata
- Class: Amphibia
- Order: Anura
- Family: Rhacophoridae
- Genus: Raorchestes
- Species: R. signatus

Binomial name
- Raorchestes signatus (Boulenger, 1882)

Synonyms
- Ixalus signatus Boulenger, 1882; Philautus signatus (Boulenger, 1882)

= Raorchestes signatus =

Species of frog

Raorchestes signatus is a species of frog in the family Rhacophoridae. It is endemic to the Western Ghats, India.

This arboreal frog has been observed in montane evergreen forests, shola forests, patches of forest, and occasionally towns, grasslands, and tea plantations. This frog has been observed between 1780 and 2465 meters above sea level.

Like other frogs in Raorchestes, this frog breeds through direct development with no free-swimming tadpole stage.

Scientists have observed some deformed individuals and speculate that it could be caused by overexposure to ultraviolet light.

The IUCN classifies this frog as vulnerable to extinction because of its smallish range and because of ongoing habitat degradation. It suffers from deforestation associated with logging and agriculture. The frog also suffers from exposure to pollution, fertilizers, and herbicides, some of which prevent the frog from reproducing.

Scientists cite climate change as another threat to this species. The Nilgiri Hills are warmer than previously, which has exacerbated encroachment by invasive species, such as eucalyptus and acacia trees. Climate change has also altered the way the water sits underground.

Scientists believe the fungus Batrachochytrium dendrobatidis can infect this frog. Batrachochytrium dendrobatidis causes the fungal disease chytridiomycosis.
