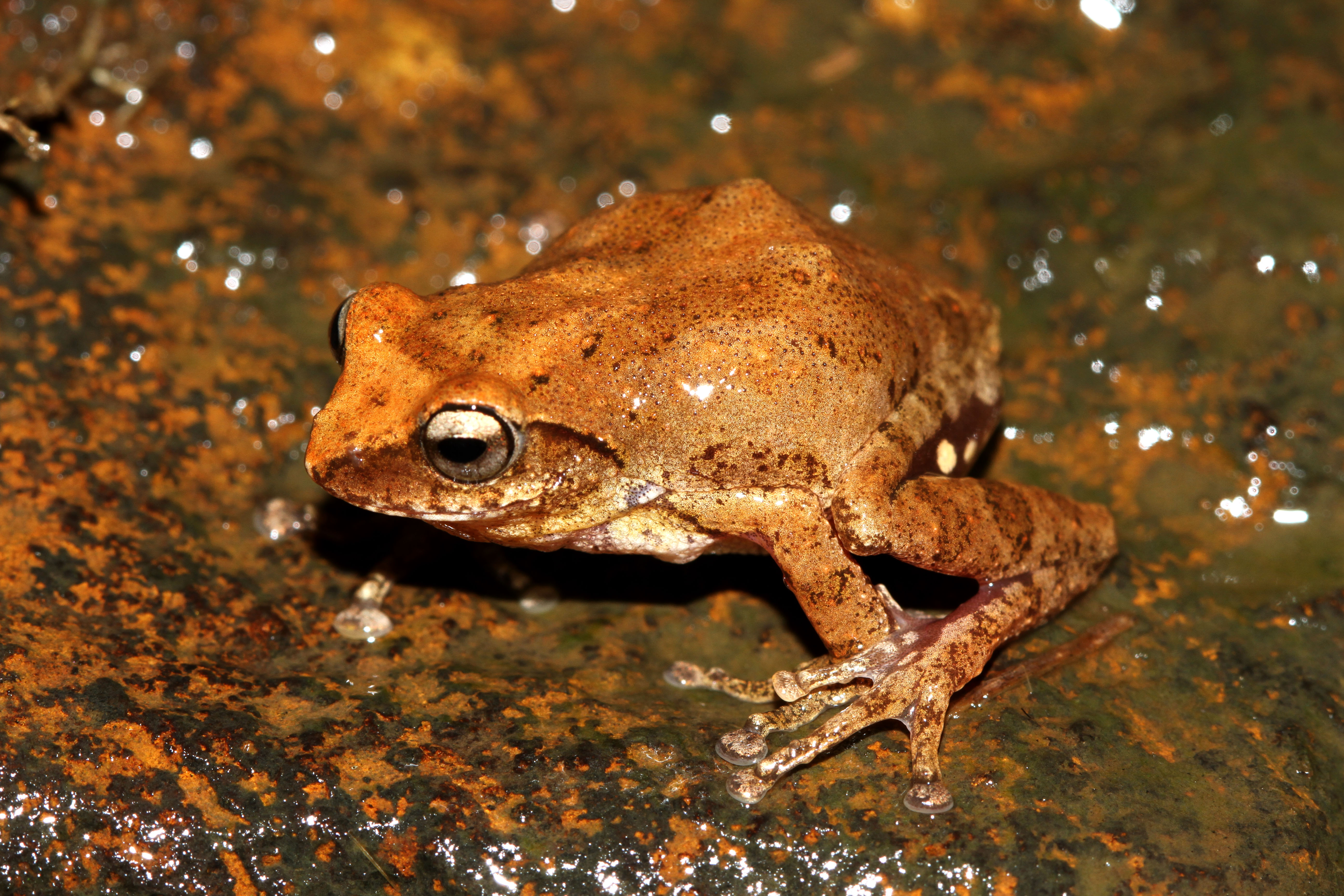

Conservation status
- Least Concern (IUCN 3.1)

Scientific classification
- Kingdom: Animalia
- Phylum: Chordata
- Class: Amphibia
- Order: Anura
- Family: Rhacophoridae
- Genus: Raorchestes
- Species: R. charius

Binomial name
- Raorchestes charius (Rao, 1937)

Synonyms
- Philautus charius Rao, 1937

= Raorchestes charius =

Species of frog

Raorchestes charius (common names: Karnataka bubble-nest frog, Seshachar's bush frog, Chari's bush frog) is a species of frog in the family Rhacophoridae. It is endemic to the Western Ghats, India. It has been observed between 800 and 1400 meters above sea level. It is an arboreal species living in tropical moist evergreen forests in the Karnataka state, and in grasslands.

This frog lives in evergreen and broadleaf forests and in grasslands, but people have also seen a few on large farms. The frog perches on plants about 1 m off the ground. The frog breeds through direct development. Both adults and froglets in have been observed in leaf litter.

Scientists believe this frog is not in danger of dying out because it lives in such a large place. Many of the places the frog lives are protected parks. This frog is in some danger from fires and from people changing its forest into farmland, building roads, and from tourism. Scientists believethat the fungal disease chytridiomycosis can infect this frog, as it does related species.
