= Dusky frog =

Dusky frog may refer to:

- Dusky gopher frog (Lithobates sevosus), a frog in the family Ranidae endemic to the southern United States
- Dusky torrent frog (Micrixalus fuscus), a frog in the family Micrixalidae found in the Western Ghats of India
- La Selle dusky frog (Eleutherodactylus jugans), a frog in the family Leptodactylidae found in the Dominican Republic and Haiti
