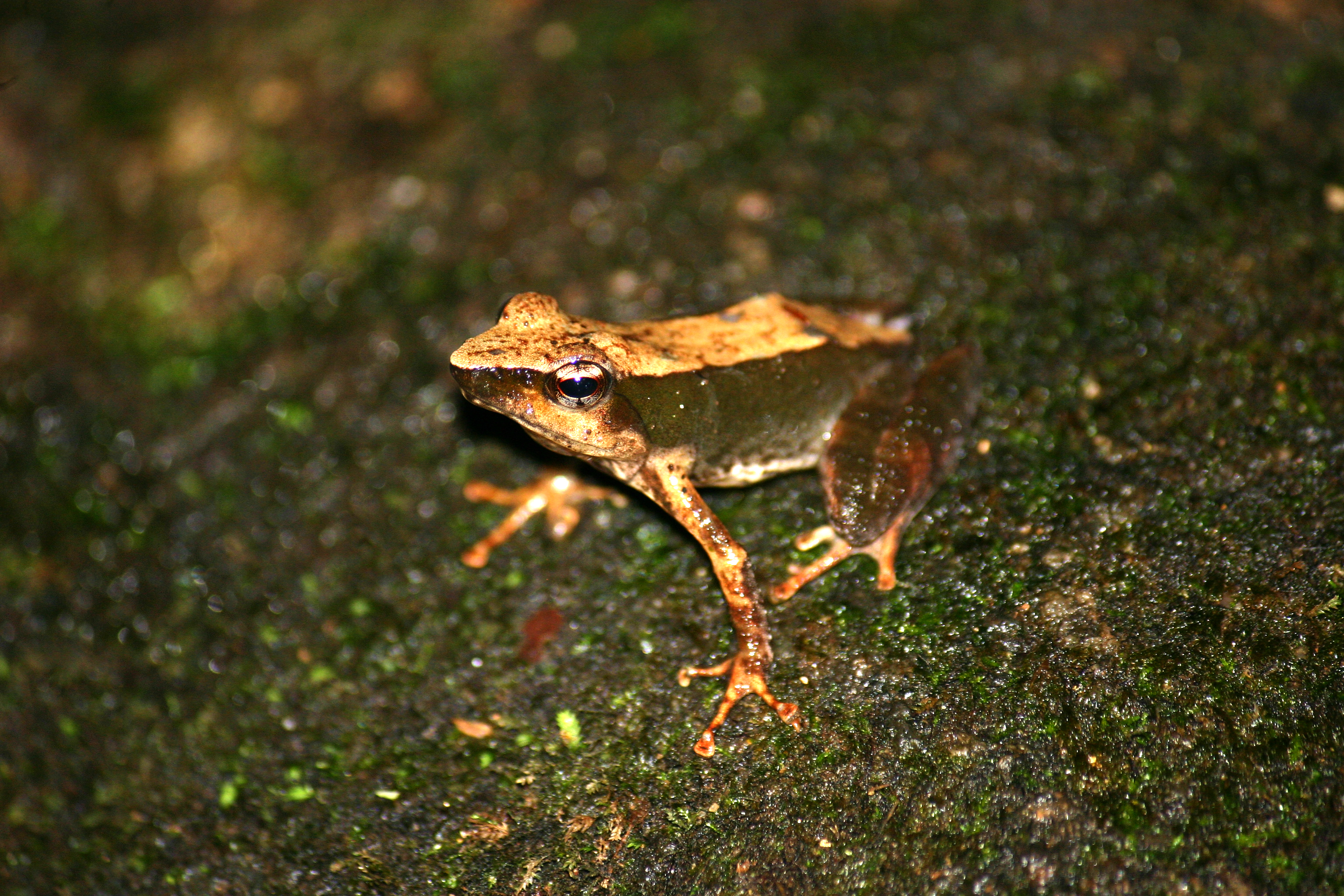

Scientific classification
- Kingdom: Animalia
- Phylum: Chordata
- Class: Amphibia
- Order: Anura
- Family: Micrixalidae
- Genus: Micrixalus
- Species: M. adonis

Binomial name
- Micrixalus adonis Biju et al., 2014

= Micrixalus adonis =

Species of amphibian

Micrixalus adonis is a newly described species of frogs in the family Micrixalidae. It is endemic to the Western Ghats in southern India, restricted to areas between the Palghat Gap and Shencottah Gap. Common name beautiful dancing frog has been proposed for this species, in reference to its vividly rich colouration.

== Description ==
M. adonis is within the colloquial Micrixalus fuscus group, including M. fuscus, M. herrei, M. kodayari, M. mallani, and M. nelliyampathi. The species share similar physical characteristics, including slender bodies, the presence of dorsolateral folds, and among others a V-shaped glandular ridge on the anterior half of the body. While being similar to other species within the Micrixalus fuscus group, M. adonis is most noticeably different in the shape of its head, which is rounded laterally. Males measure 22–24 mm (0.87–0.94 in) and females 27–30 mm (1.1–1.2 in) in snout–vent length.

Foot-flagging has not been observed in this species, presence of flashy colouration on dorsal surface of the hind limb together with the degree of webbing and habitat preference suggest that it might nevertheless possess this behaviour.

== Habitat ==
Its natural habitat is rivers with a forested canopy. It is not known from any protected area.
