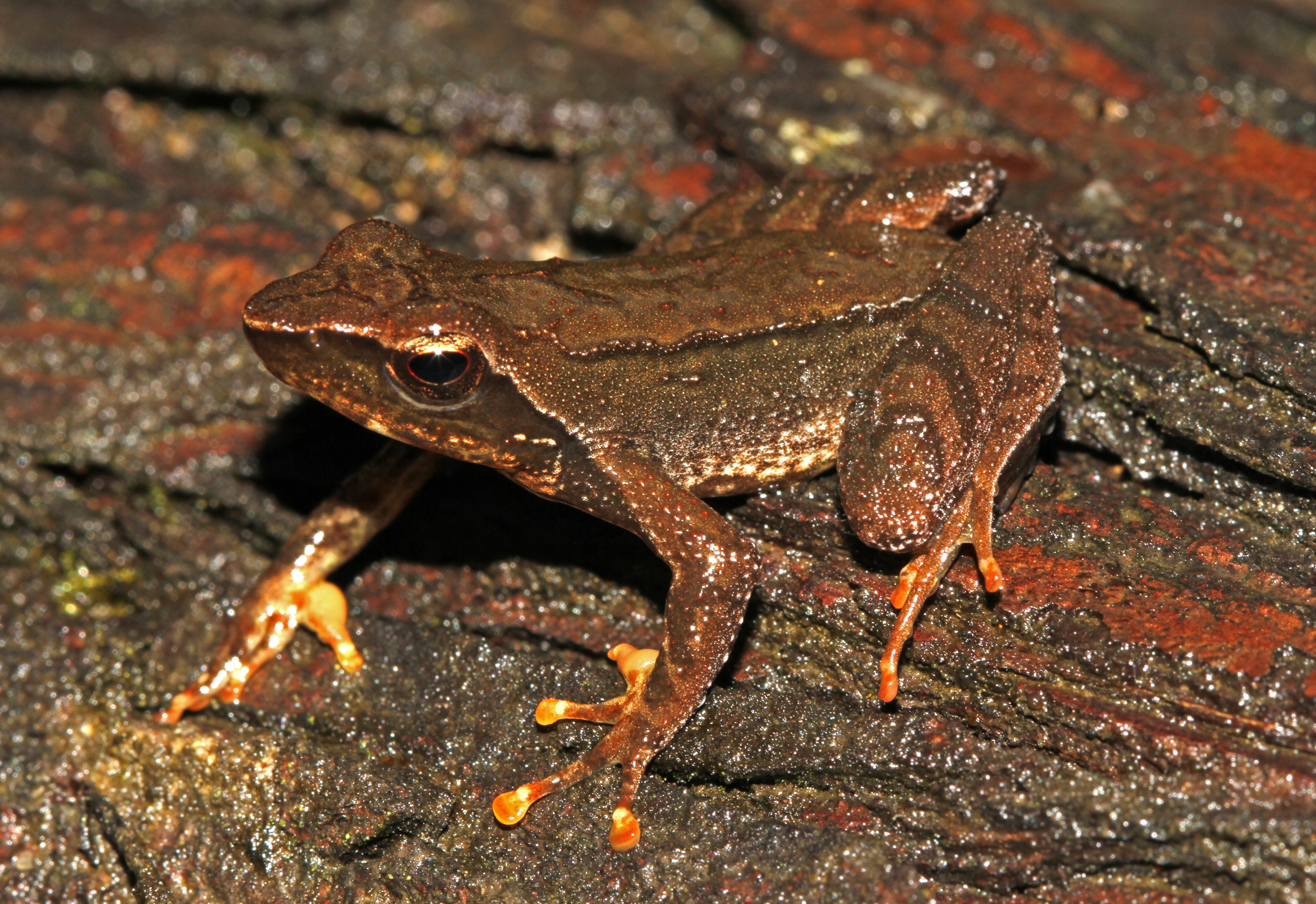

Scientific classification
- Kingdom: Animalia
- Phylum: Chordata
- Class: Amphibia
- Order: Anura
- Family: Micrixalidae
- Genus: Micrixalus
- Species: M. frigidus

Binomial name
- Micrixalus frigidus Biju et al., 2014

= Micrixalus frigidus =

Species of frog

Micrixalus frigidus is a species of frogs in the family Micrixalidae. It is endemic to the Western Ghats, India. Its natural habitats are subtropical or tropical moist lowland forest and rivers.
