= Micrixalus nudis =

Conservation status
- Vulnerable (IUCN 3.1)

Scientific classification
- Kingdom: Animalia
- Phylum: Chordata
- Class: Amphibia
- Order: Anura
- Family: Micrixalidae
- Genus: Micrixalus
- Species: M. nudis

Binomial name
- Micrixalus nudis Pillai, 1978

Species of frog

Micrixalus nudis is a species of frog in the family Micrixalidae. It is endemic to the Western Ghats, India.

Its natural habitats are subtropical or tropical moist lowland forests and rivers. It is threatened by habitat loss.
