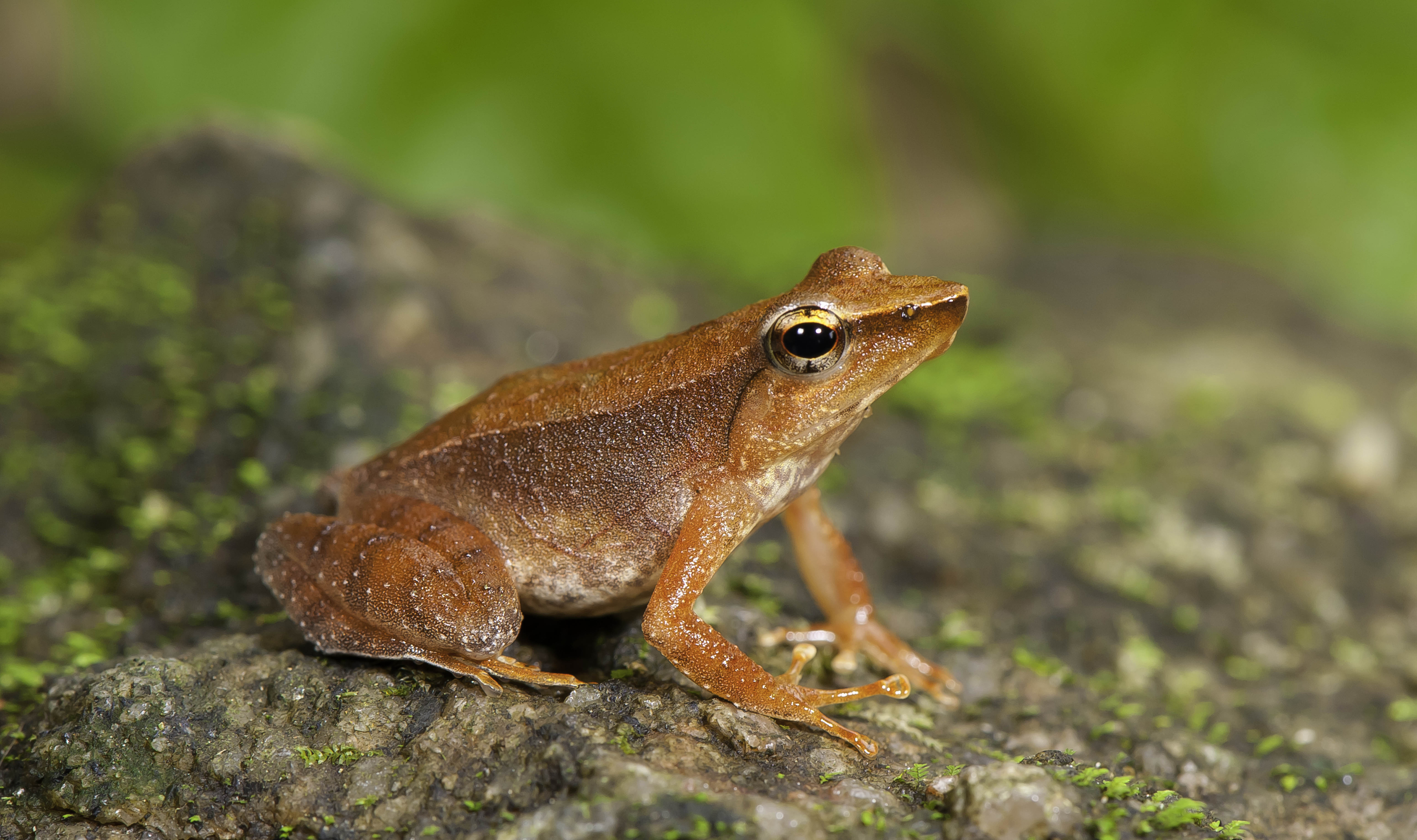

Scientific classification
- Kingdom: Animalia
- Phylum: Chordata
- Class: Amphibia
- Order: Anura
- Family: Micrixalidae
- Genus: Micrixalus
- Species: M. nelliyampathi

Binomial name
- Micrixalus nelliyampathi Biju et al., 2014

= Micrixalus nelliyampathi =

Species of amphibian

Micrixalus nelliyampathi is a newly described species of frog in the family Micrixalidae. It is endemic to the Western Ghats, India.

Its natural habitats are subtropical or tropical moist lowland forest and rivers.
