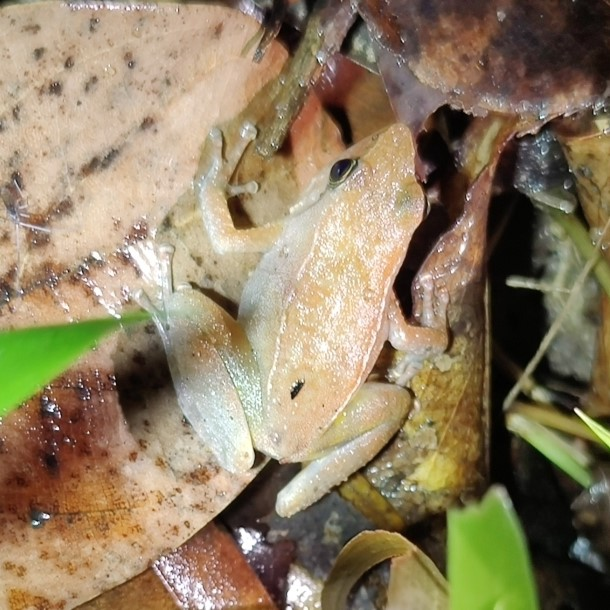

Scientific classification
- Kingdom: Animalia
- Phylum: Chordata
- Class: Amphibia
- Order: Anura
- Family: Micrixalidae
- Genus: Micrixalus
- Species: M. kodayari

Binomial name
- Micrixalus kodayari Biju et al., 2014

= Micrixalus kodayari =

Species of amphibian

Micrixalus kodayari, commonly known as the Kodayar dancing frog, is a species of frog in the family Micrixalidae. It is endemic to the Western Ghats south of the Shencottah Gap in Tamil Nadu, India; it is known from Kodayar and Kakkachi (Tirunelveli district).

== Description ==
Adult females, based on the holotype and two paratypes, measure 25.1–25.6 mm (0.99–1.01 in) in snout–vent length. Two adult male paratypes measured 17.7–18.7 mm (0.70–0.74 in). The snout is subelliptical in dorsal view and acute in lateral view. The head is longer than it is wide. The tympanum is visible and the supratympanic fold is well-developed. The finger and toe tips bear relatively wide discs. The toes are partly webbed. The dorsal colouration is uniform greyish-brown with metallic tinge. The tympanum and its surroundings are light brown. The iris is light brown with reddish tinge. The anterior part of the flanks are dark blackish-brown and the posterior parts are light greyish-brown. Ventral colouration is greyish-white. The shank and feet are bluish-grey, while the webbing is dark greyish-black.

The female holotype was carrying 20 creamy white ova with black reticulations measuring about 1 mm in diameter. Foot-flagging behaviour has not been observed in the males of this species, but it has morphological features correlated with that behaviour (flashy foot colouration and webbed toes).

== Habitat and conservation ==
Micrixalus kodayari inhabits shallow water of streams covered with forest canopy. It is a rare species. As of May 2022, it has not been assessed for the IUCN Red List of Threatened Species.
