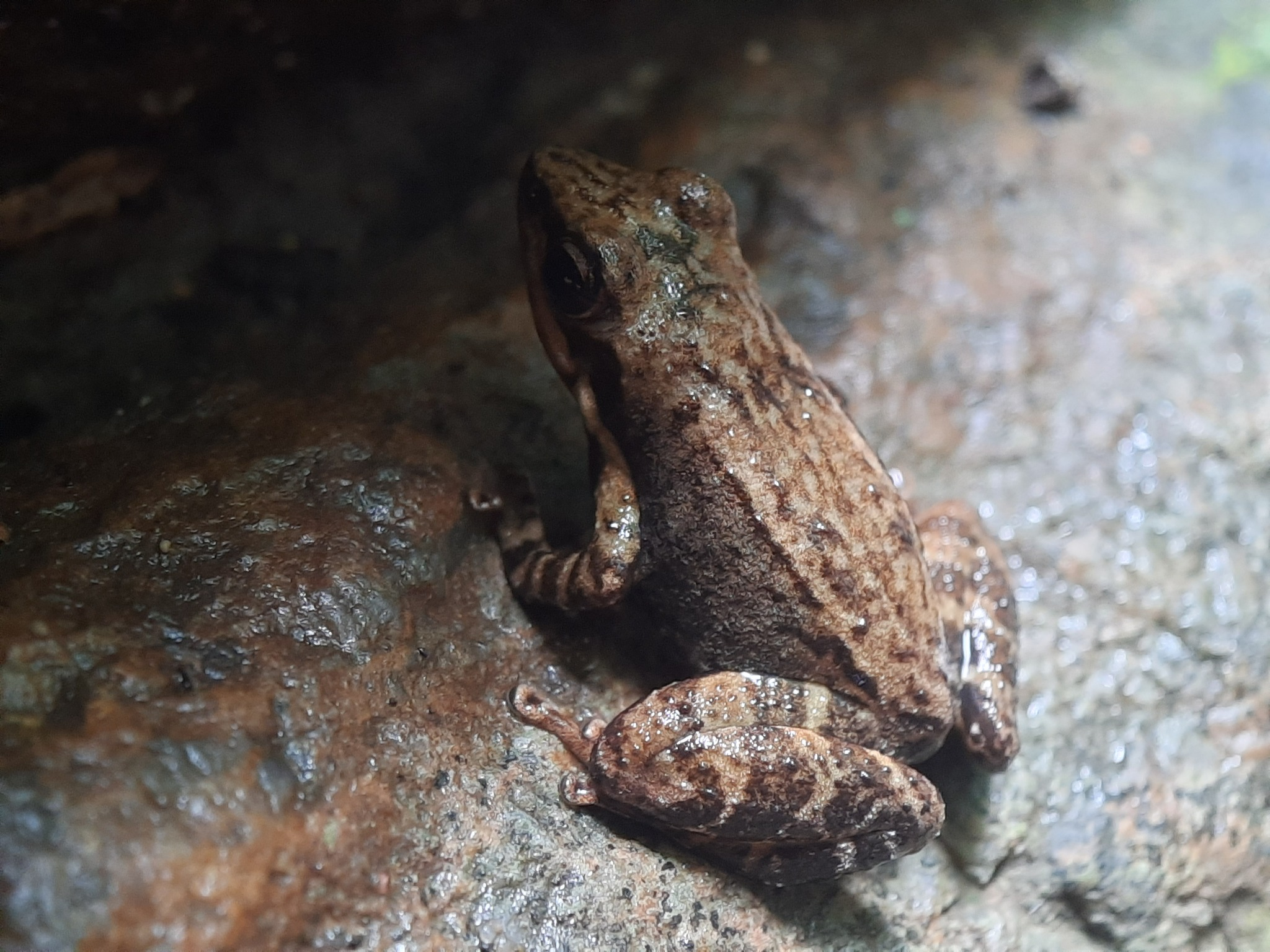

Conservation status
- Critically Endangered (IUCN 3.1)

Scientific classification
- Kingdom: Animalia
- Phylum: Chordata
- Class: Amphibia
- Order: Anura
- Family: Micrixalidae
- Genus: Micrixalus
- Species: M. spelunca

Binomial name
- Micrixalus spelunca Biju et al., 2014

= Micrixalus spelunca =

Species of amphibian

Micrixalus spelunca is a species of frogs in the family Micrixalidae. It is endemic to the Western Ghats, India.

Its natural habitats are subtropical or tropical moist lowland forest and rivers.
