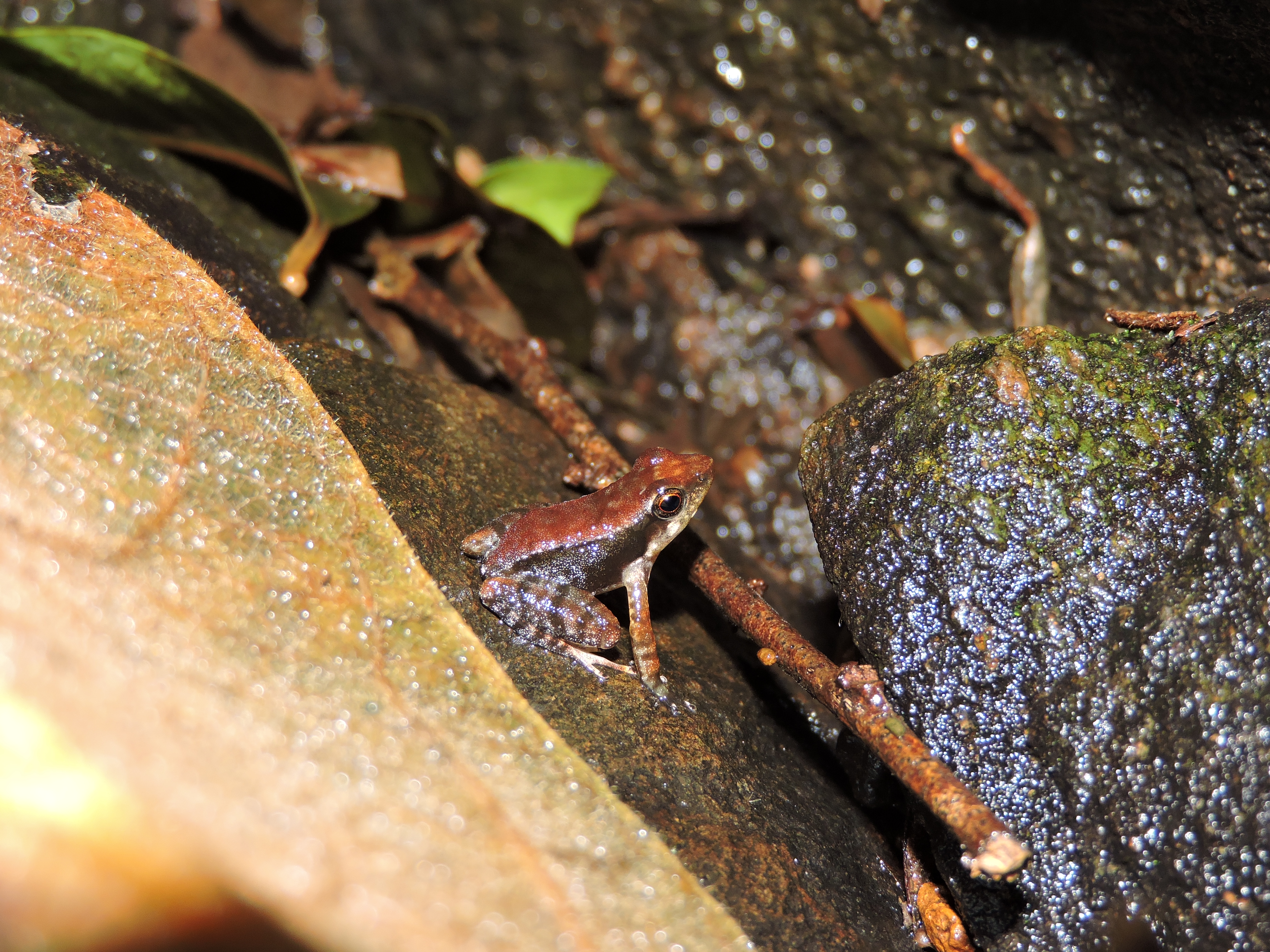

Conservation status
- Vulnerable (IUCN 3.1)

Scientific classification
- Kingdom: Animalia
- Phylum: Chordata
- Class: Amphibia
- Order: Anura
- Family: Micrixalidae
- Genus: Micrixalus
- Species: M. elegans

Binomial name
- Micrixalus elegans (Rao, 1937)

Synonyms
- Philautus elegans Rao, 1937

= Micrixalus elegans =

Species of amphibian

Micrixalus elegans also known as "Elegant Dancing Frog" is a species of frog in the family Micrixalidae. It is endemic to the Western Ghats, India, and occurs between the Palakkad Gap and Goa Gap in the states of Kerala and Karnataka. Micrixalus elegans is one of the Micrixalus species showing "foot-flagging" behaviour, hence the common name elegant dancing frog was proposed. Other common names are elegant torrent frog and elegant bush frog.

== Description ==
Males measure 13–15.5 mm (0.51–0.61 in) and females 17.7–21 mm (0.70–0.83 in) in snout–vent length. The dorsum is uniformly reddish brown, with scattered yellowish grey spots. The sides of the head are distinctly dark blackish brown. The dorsal surfaces of the limbs are reddish brown with dark brown bands.

Males of this species show "foot-flagging" behaviour, stretching the entire hing leg away from the body, that they occasionally conduct, along with calling. Males may also engage in male-male combats, kicking each other.

== Habitat and conservation ==
Its natural habitats are tropical moist lowland forests and rivers. It prefers damp leaf litter by fast-flowing forest streams.

This species was for a long time only known from the holotype, which is probably lost. However, it was rediscovered in 2010 and found to be relatively common; the small adult size of this species might have led researchers to mistake them as juveniles of another species. Classified as "data deficient" before its rediscovery, the species is now known from several localities, some of them in or near protected areas.

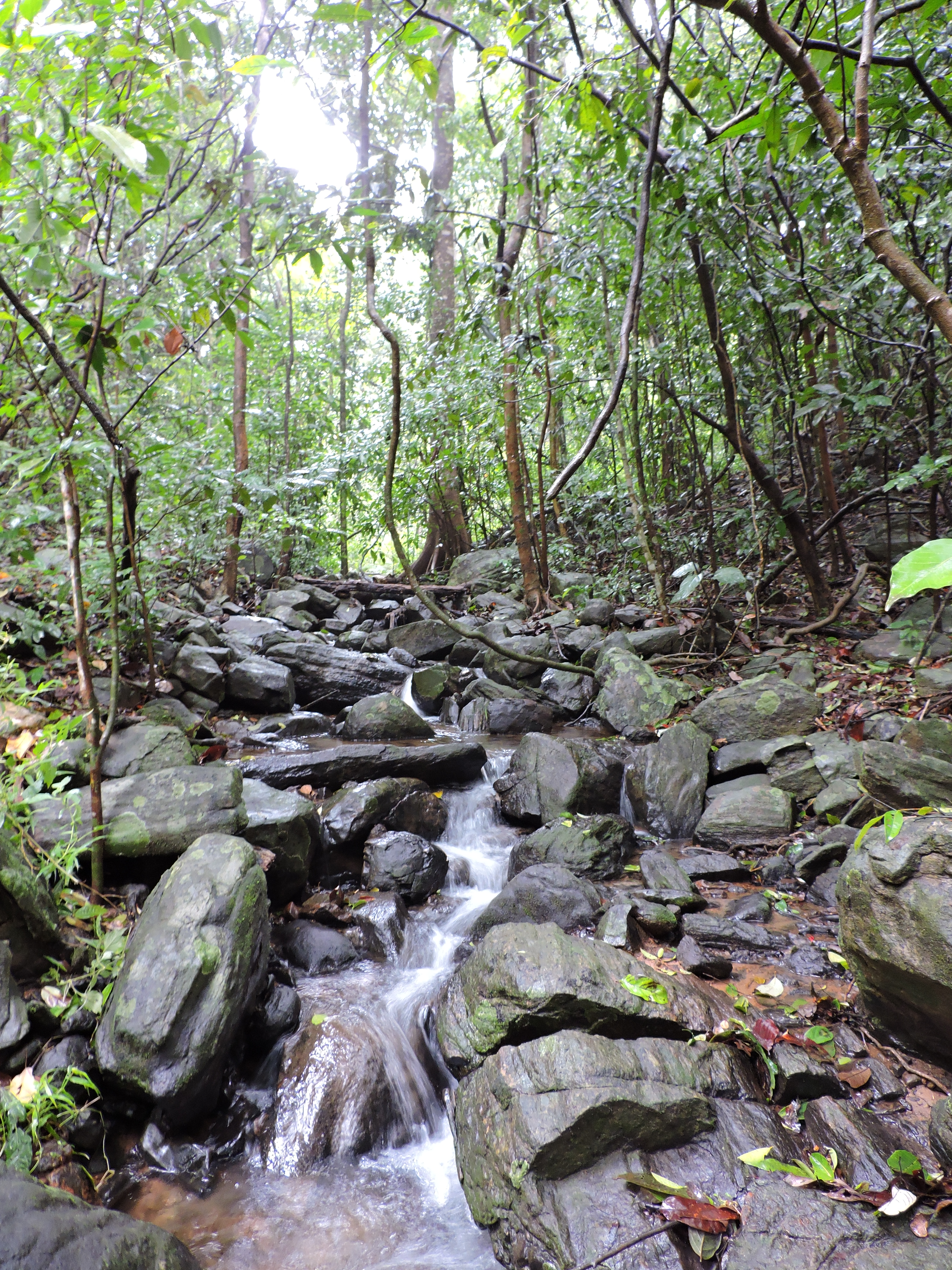
Typical habitat for Micrixalus elegans.

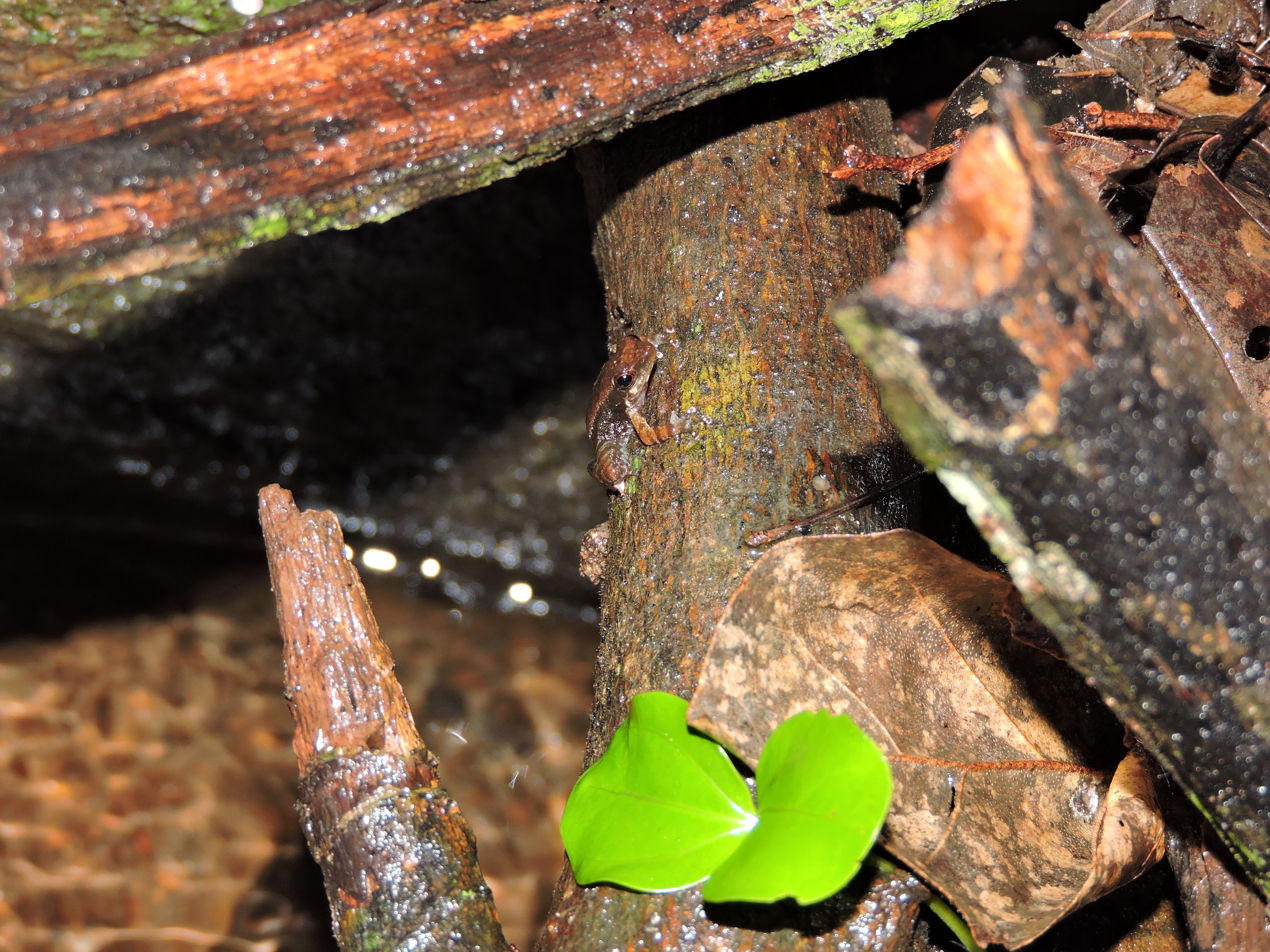
Micrixalus elegans amongst leaf litter and fallen logs near a fresh-water stream.

== Diet and nutrition ==
The typical diet of Micrixalus elegans is a mixture of crickets, roaches, and mealworms.
