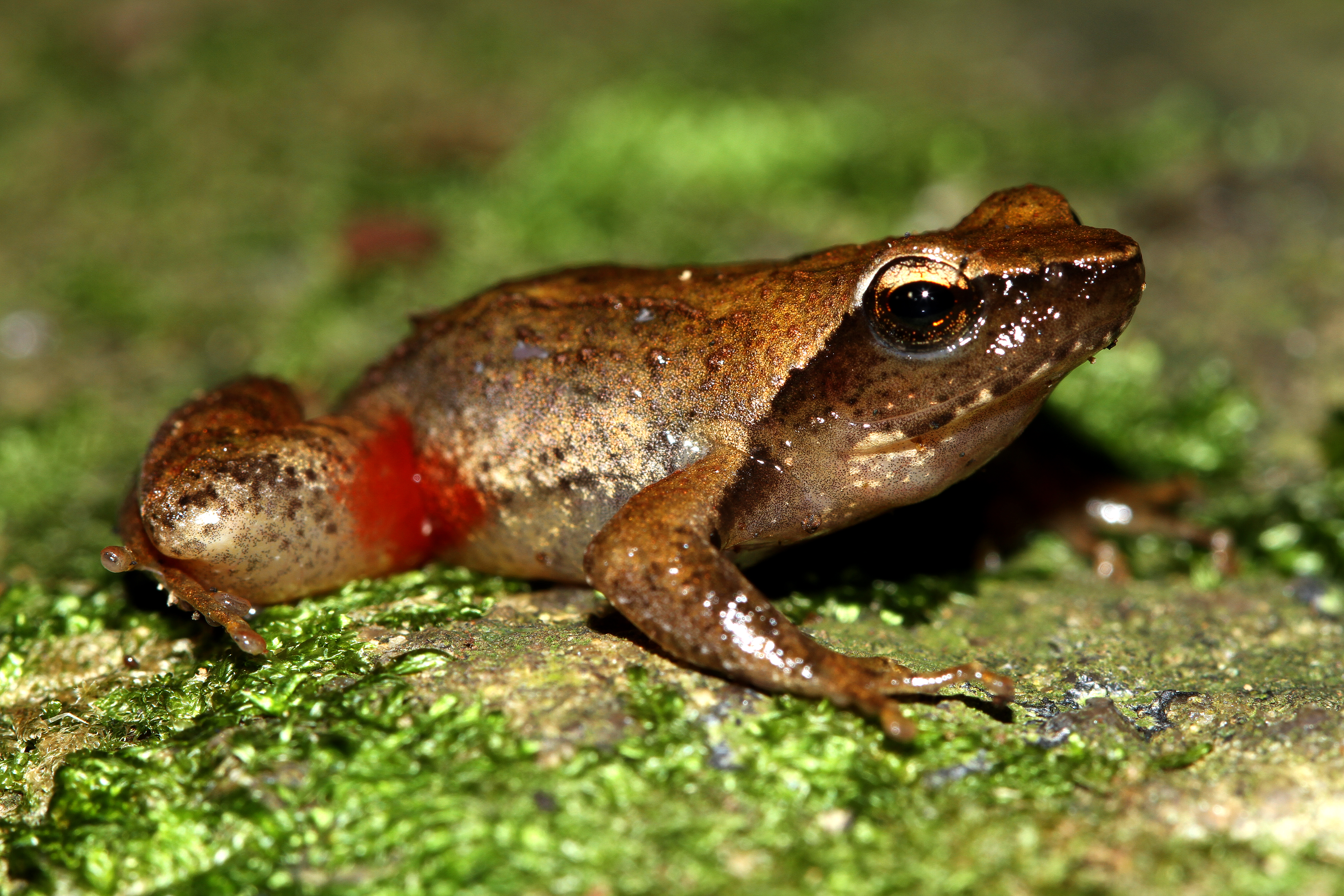

Conservation status
- Vulnerable (IUCN 3.1)

Scientific classification
- Kingdom: Animalia
- Phylum: Chordata
- Class: Amphibia
- Order: Anura
- Family: Micrixalidae
- Genus: Micrixalus
- Species: M. phyllophilus

Binomial name
- Micrixalus phyllophilus (Jerdon, 1853)

Synonyms
- M. opisthorhodus (Boulenger, 1890)

= Micrixalus phyllophilus =

Species of frog

Micrixalus phyllophilus is a species of frog in the family Micrixalidae. It is endemic to the Western Ghats, India.

Its natural habitats are subtropical or tropical moist lowland forests, subtropical or tropical moist montane forests, and rivers. It is threatened by habitat loss.
