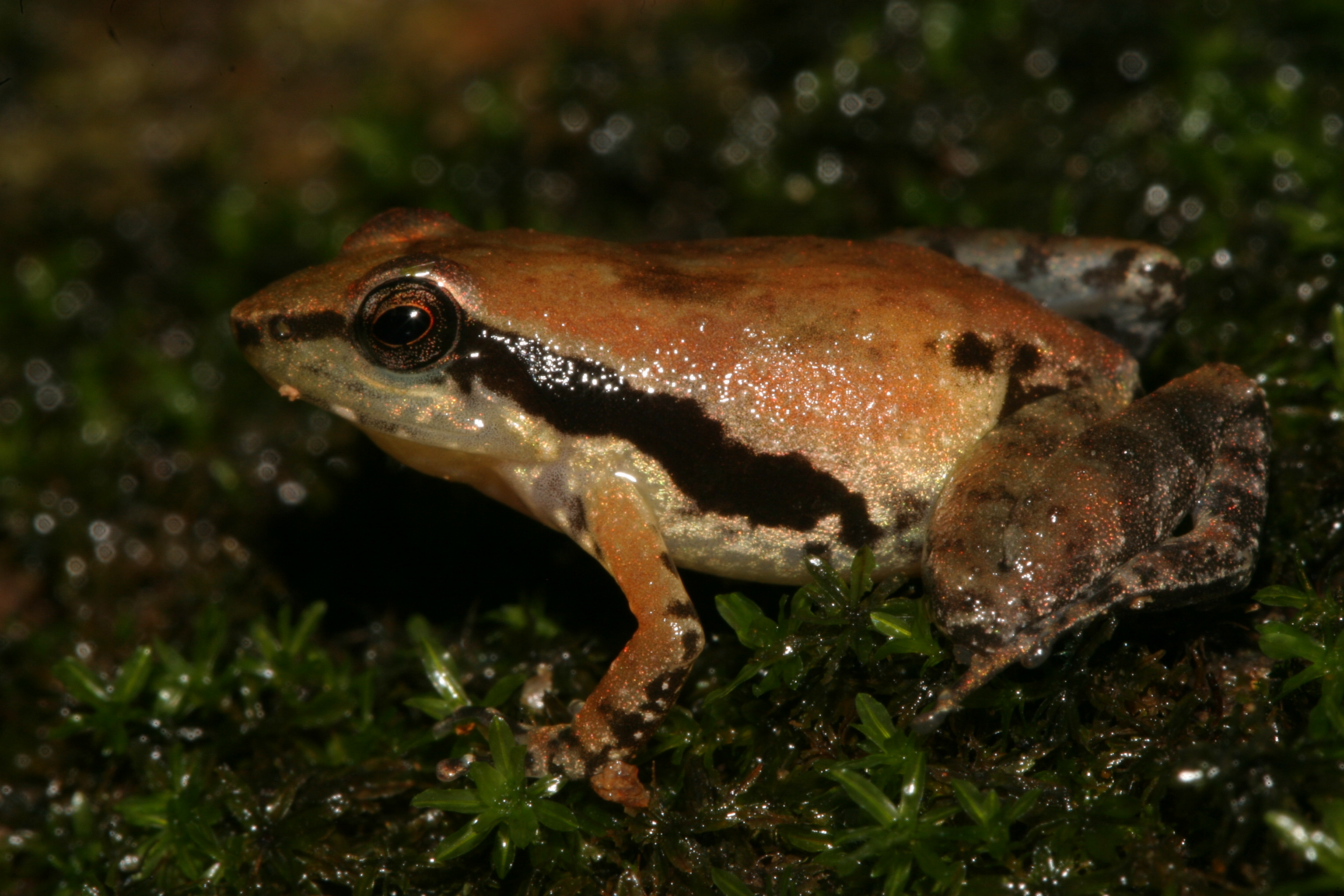

Conservation status
- Endangered (IUCN 3.1)

Scientific classification
- Kingdom: Animalia
- Phylum: Chordata
- Class: Amphibia
- Order: Anura
- Family: Micrixalidae
- Genus: Micrixalus
- Species: M. thampii

Binomial name
- Micrixalus thampii Pillai, 1981

= Micrixalus thampii =

Species of amphibian

Micrixalus thampii, commonly called Thampi's torrent frog, is a frog species in the family Micrixalidae. It is endemic to the Western Ghats in India and to date recorded only in Silent Valley National Park. Its natural habitats are subtropical or tropical moist lowland forests and rivers.
