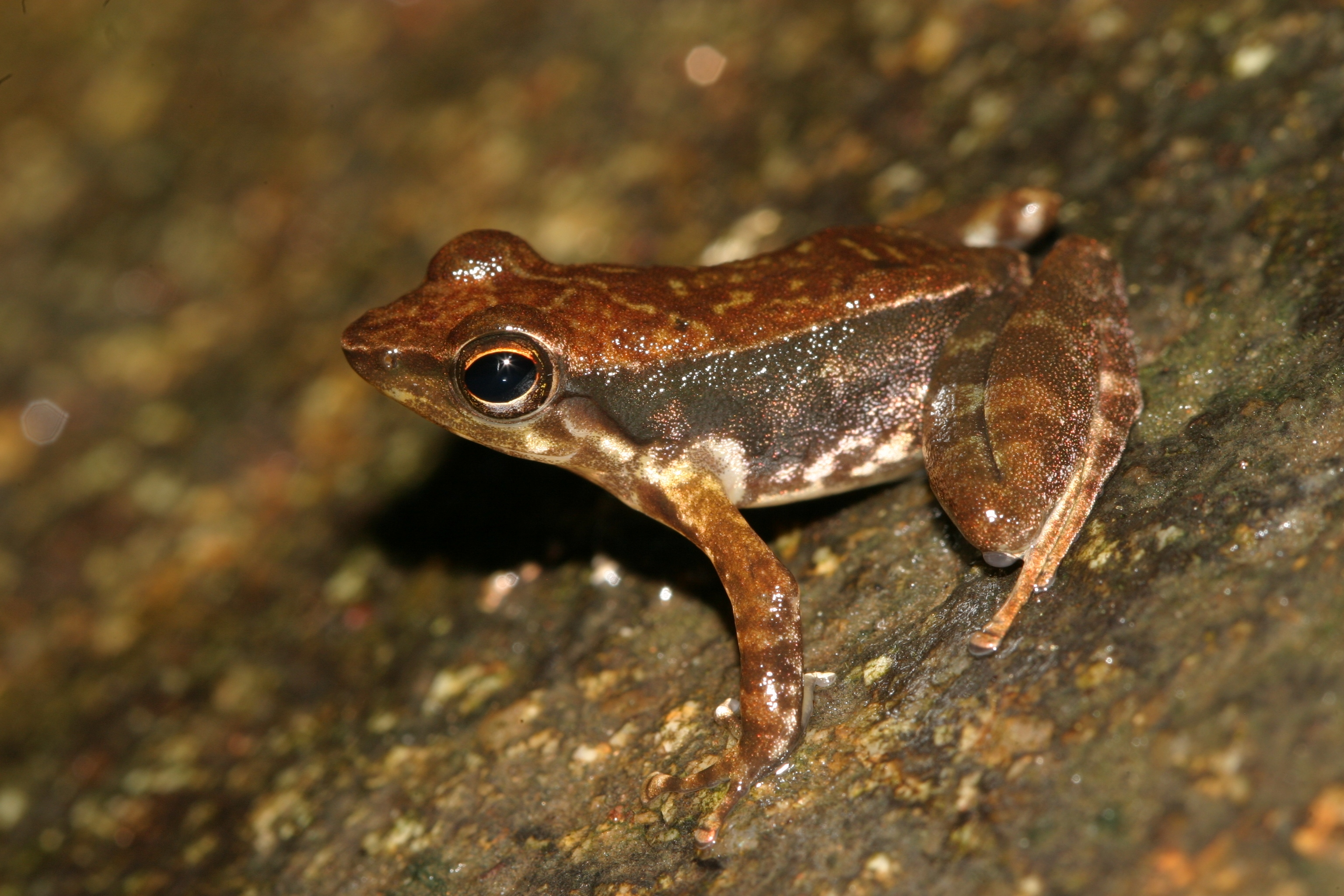

Scientific classification
- Kingdom: Animalia
- Phylum: Chordata
- Class: Amphibia
- Order: Anura
- Family: Micrixalidae
- Genus: Micrixalus
- Species: M. herrei

Binomial name
- Micrixalus herrei Myers, 1942

= Micrixalus herrei =

Species of frog

Micrixalus herrei is a newly redescribed species of frog in the family Micrixalidae. Originally described in 1942, it was synonymized with M. fuscus in 1984. However, morphological differences as well as DNA evidence confirm this species to be valid. It is endemic to the Western Ghats, India, and occurs south of the Shencottah Gap in Kerala and Tamil Nadu states. The common name Kallar dancing frog has been proposed for this species, in reference to Kallar, Trivandrum, its type locality.

== Description ==
Males measure 16.7–19.4 mm (0.66–0.76 in) and females 24.8–26.6 mm (0.98–1.05 in) in snout–vent length. The head is small and flat above with a pointed snout that is rounded in lateral view. The dorsum is reddish orange with irregular, light brown patches. The tympanum and its surroundings are dark grey. The throat, chest, and belly are greyish white with some greyish yellow reticulation on the belly.

Male Micrixalus herrei have a single vocal sac and a nuptial pad on the first finger. Characteristic for the genus, they display the foot-flagging behaviour. Male-male combat also involves kicking.

== Habitat ==
The natural habitats of this species are fast-flowing streams and rivulets in primary and secondary forests. It is relatively abundant where it has been found.
