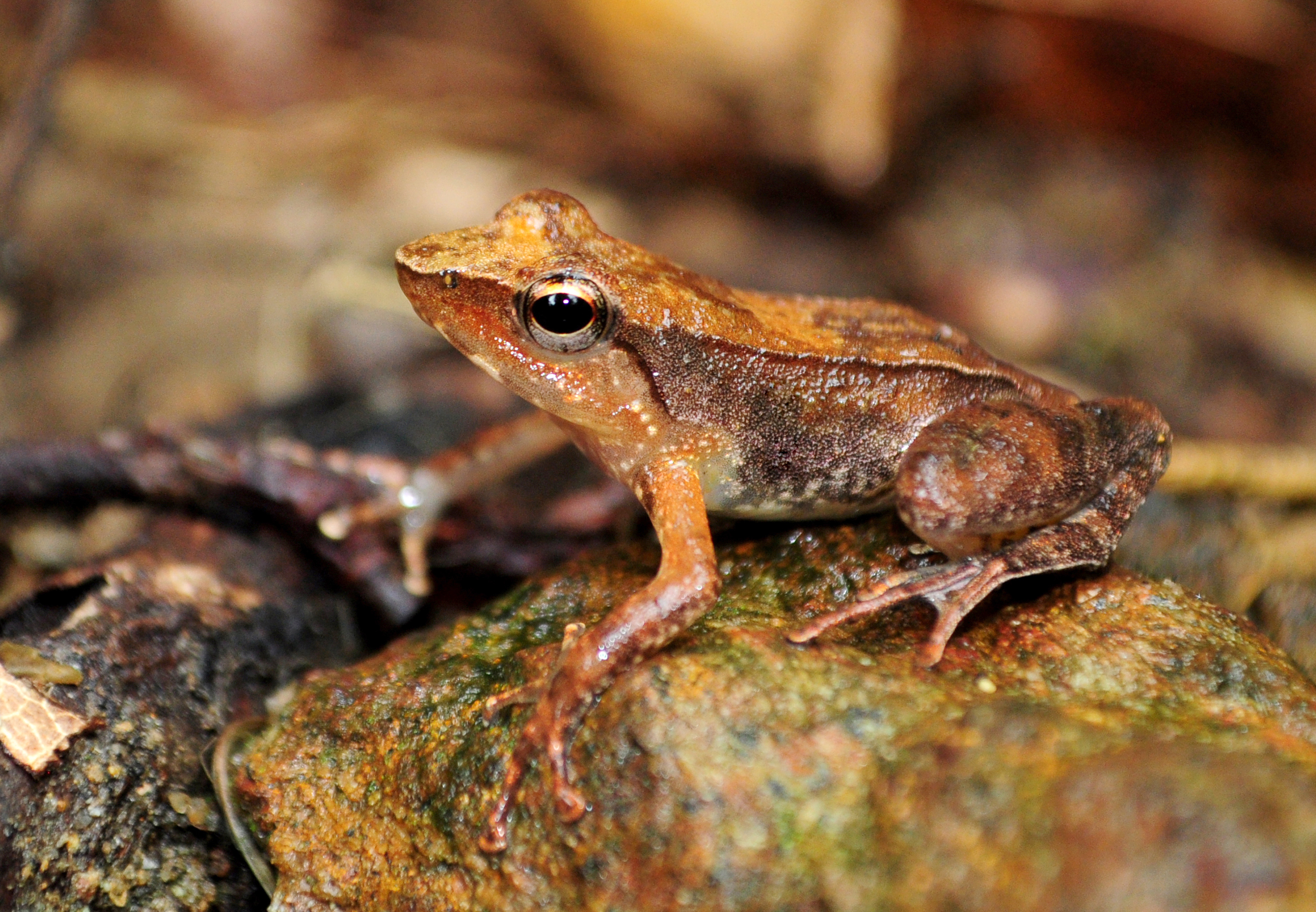

Scientific classification
- Kingdom: Animalia
- Phylum: Chordata
- Class: Amphibia
- Order: Anura
- Family: Micrixalidae
- Genus: Micrixalus
- Species: M. mallani

Binomial name
- Micrixalus mallani Biju et al., 2014

= Micrixalus mallani =

Species of amphibian

Micrixalus mallani is a species of frogs in the family Micrixalidae. It is endemic to the Western Ghats, India.

Its natural habitats are subtropical or tropical moist lowland forest and rivers.

This species is named after Mr. Mallan Kani, in appreciation of his tremendous support and companionship in the field to S D Biju since 1998.
