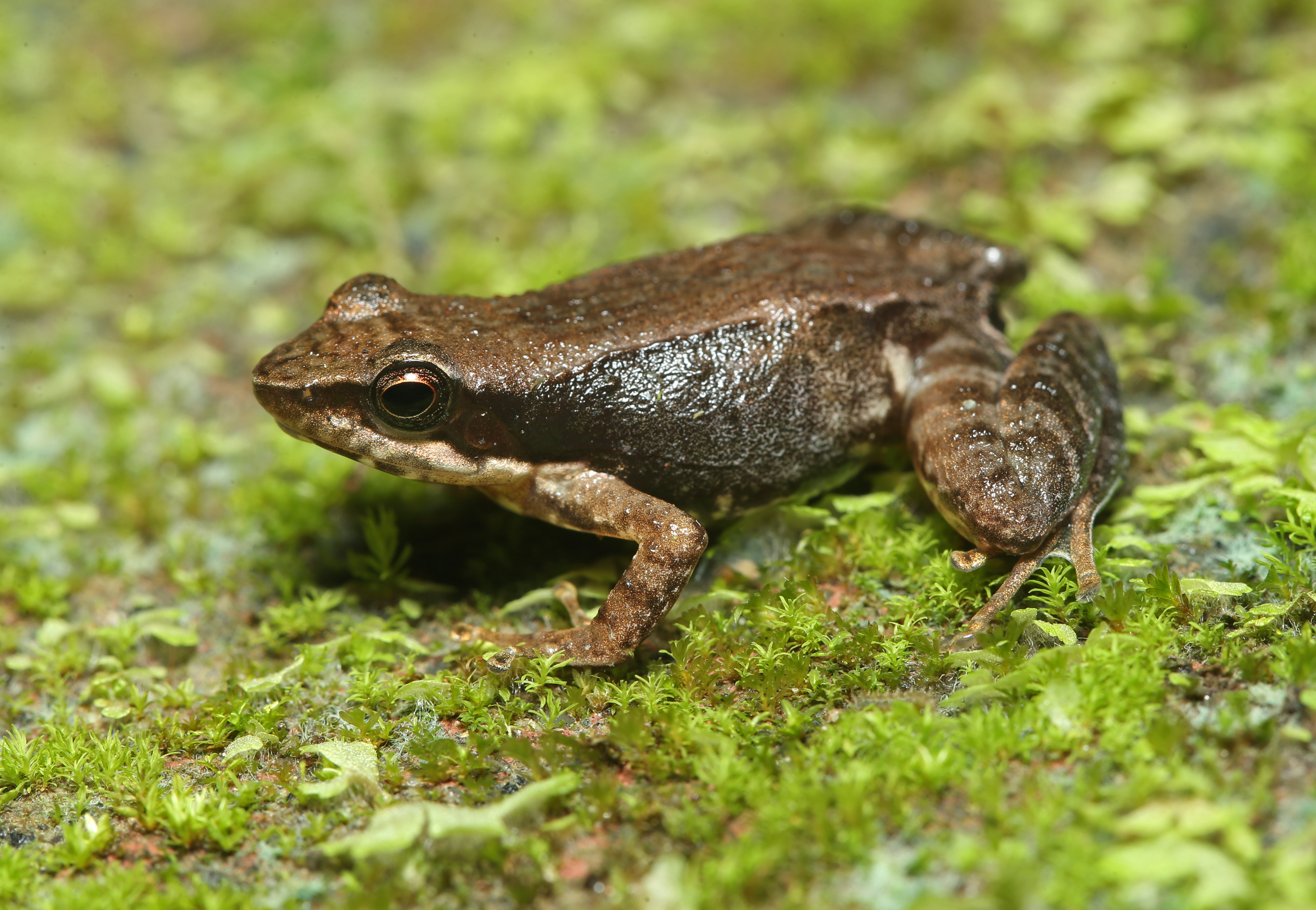

Scientific classification
- Kingdom: Animalia
- Phylum: Chordata
- Class: Amphibia
- Order: Anura
- Family: Micrixalidae
- Genus: Micrixalus
- Species: M. kurichiyari

Binomial name
- Micrixalus kurichiyari Biju et al., 2014

= Micrixalus kurichiyari =

Species of frogs

Micrixalus kurichiyari is a species of frogs in the family Micrixalidae. It is endemic to the Western Ghats, India, and only known from its type locality, Kurichiyarmala in the Wayanad District, Kerala state. Common name Kurichiyar dancing frog has been coined for it, in reference to the type locality.

== Description ==
Adult males in the type series measure 17.4–19.7 mm (0.69–0.78 in) in snout–vent length, females are not known. The head is small, longer than it is wide. The snout is subelliptical in dorsal view and acute in lateral view. The tympanum is visible. The fingers have moderately expanded discs. The toes have discs and webbing. The dorsum is uniformly brown. The tympanum and surrounding areas are dark brown. The flanks are brownish black anteriorly and light greyish-brown posteriorly.

Foot-flagging has not been observed in this species, presence of flashy colouration on dorsal surface of the hind limb together with the degree of webbing and habitat preference suggest that it might nevertheless possess this behaviour.

== Habitat ==
Its natural habitat is streams with a forested canopy. The type locality is at an elevation of 1,210 m (3,970 ft) above sea level. The locality is near a protected area.

Micrixalus kurichiyari is only known from Kurichiyarmala in the Wayanad District, Kerala
