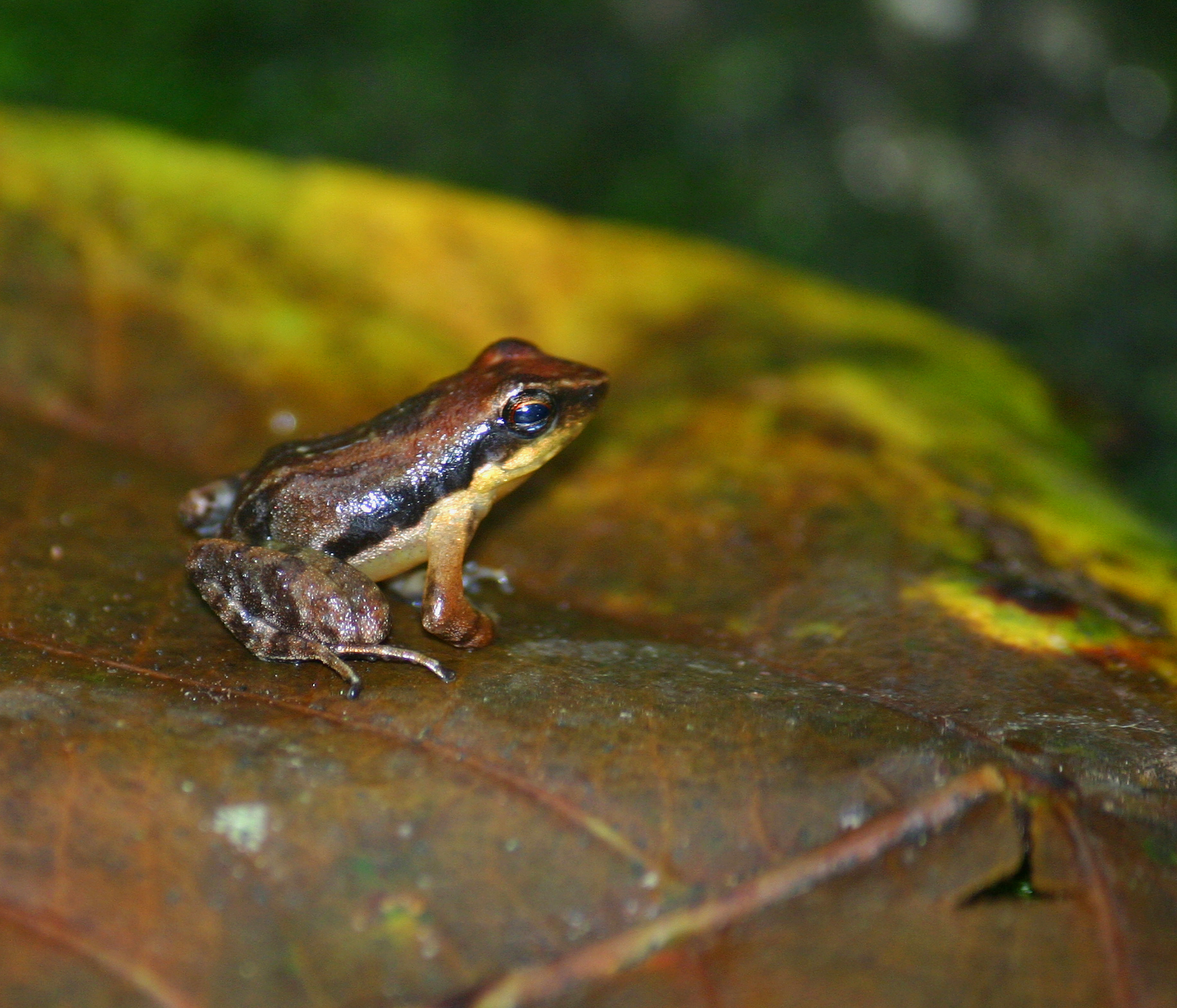

Conservation status
- Endangered (IUCN 3.1)

Scientific classification
- Kingdom: Animalia
- Phylum: Chordata
- Class: Amphibia
- Order: Anura
- Family: Micrixalidae
- Genus: Micrixalus
- Species: M. gadgili

Binomial name
- Micrixalus gadgili Pillai & Pattabiraman, 1990

= Micrixalus gadgili =

Species of frog

Micrixalus gadgili (commonly known as Gadgil's Torrent Frog or Gadgil's Dancing Frog) is a species of frog in the family Micrixalidae. It is endemic to the southern Western Ghats, India.

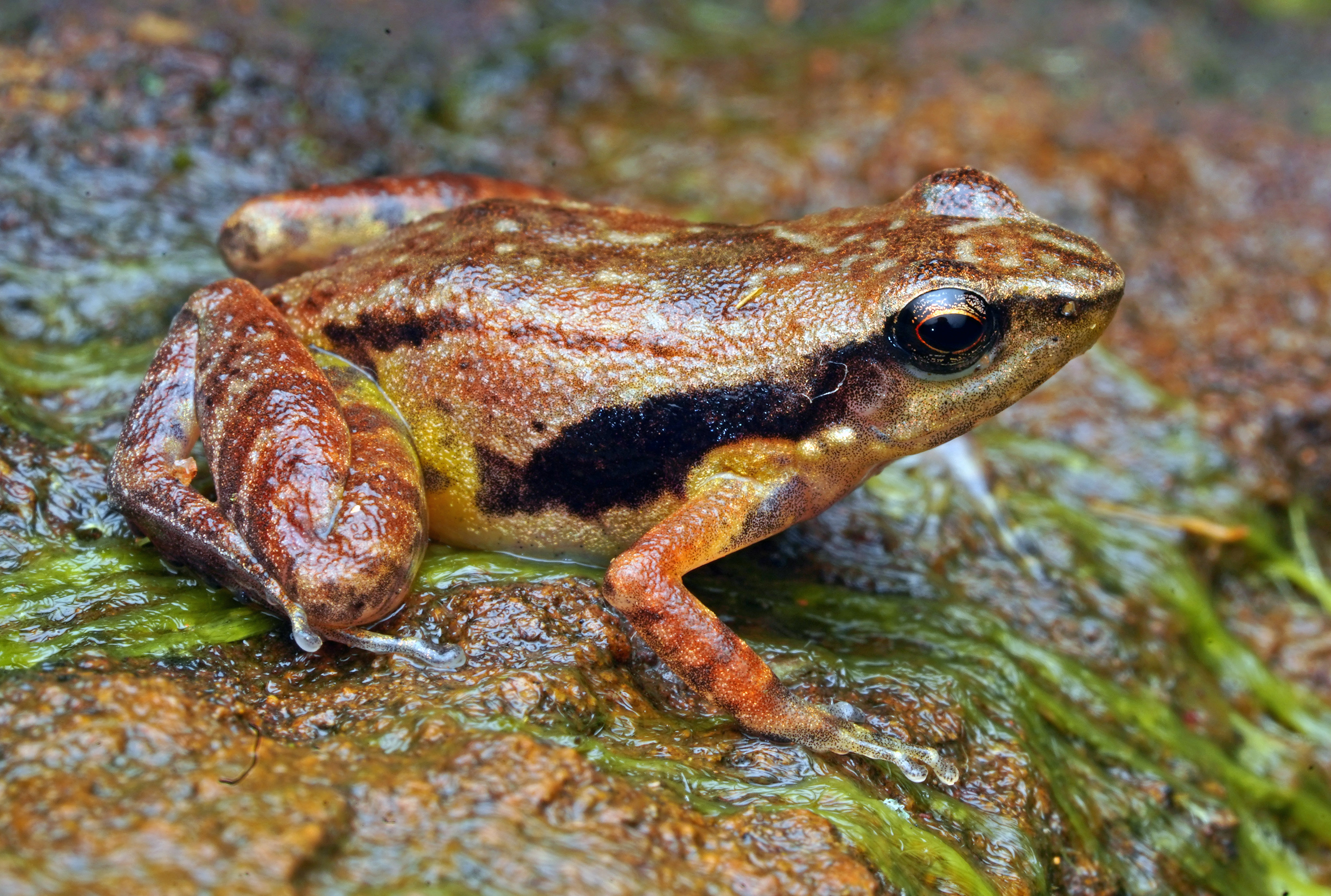

Its natural habitats are tropical moist lowland forests and rivers. It is threatened by habitat loss.

The frog is named after Indian ecologist Madhav Gadgil.
