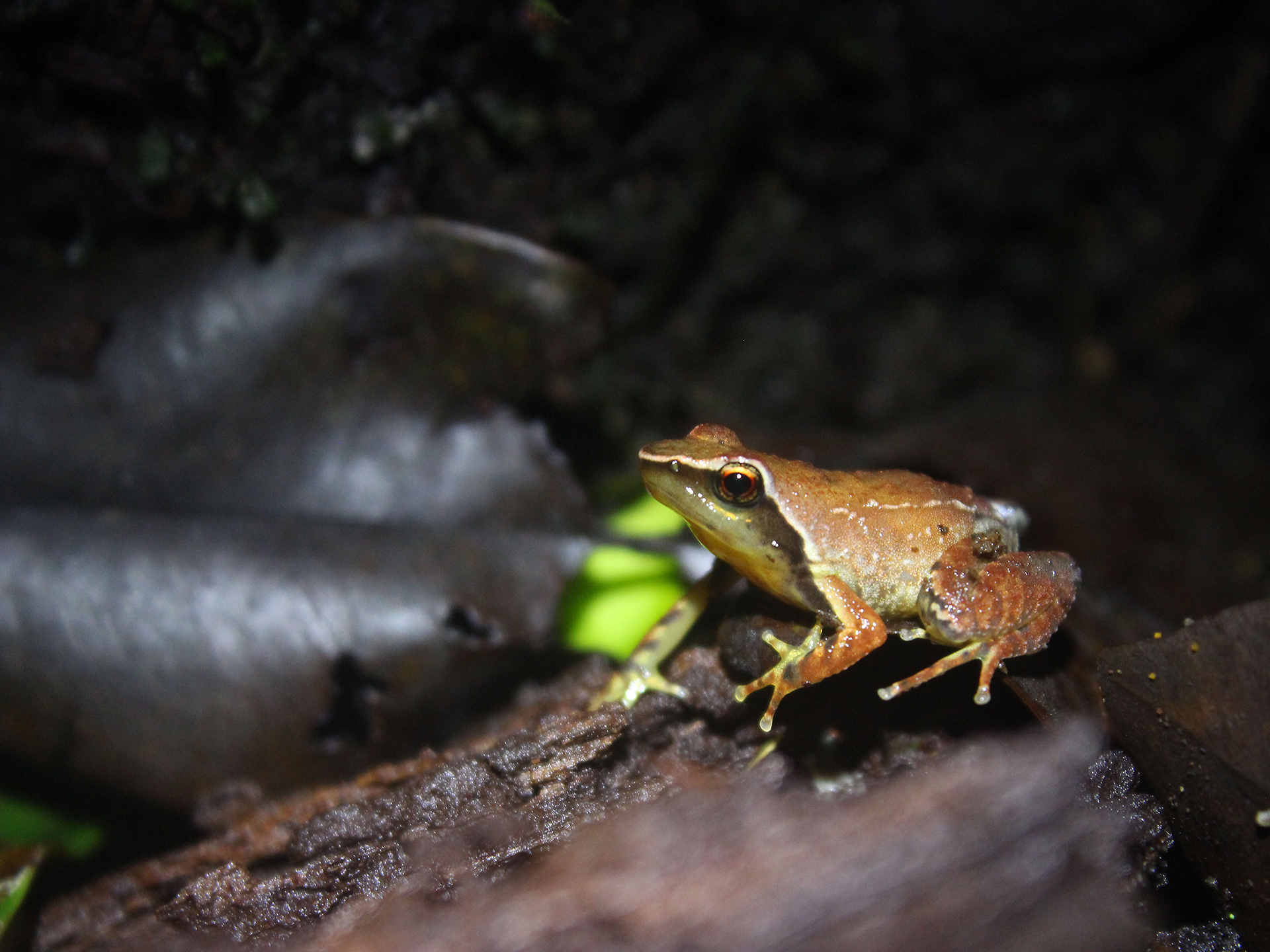

Conservation status
- Endangered (IUCN 3.1)

Scientific classification
- Kingdom: Animalia
- Phylum: Chordata
- Class: Amphibia
- Order: Anura
- Family: Micrixalidae
- Genus: Micrixalus
- Species: M. silvaticus

Binomial name
- Micrixalus silvaticus (Boulenger, 1882)

= Micrixalus silvaticus =

Species of frog

Micrixalus silvaticus, the forest dancing frog, is a species of frog in the family Micrixalidae. It is endemic to the Western Ghats, India.

Its natural habitats are subtropical or tropical moist lowland forests, subtropical or tropical moist montane forests, and rivers.

== Geographic range ==
It is only known from very restricted localities in Kerala and Tamil Nadu state, especially around Kadalar Estate in Idukki District, and Valparai in Coimbatore District, south of the Palghat Gap in the Western Ghats.
