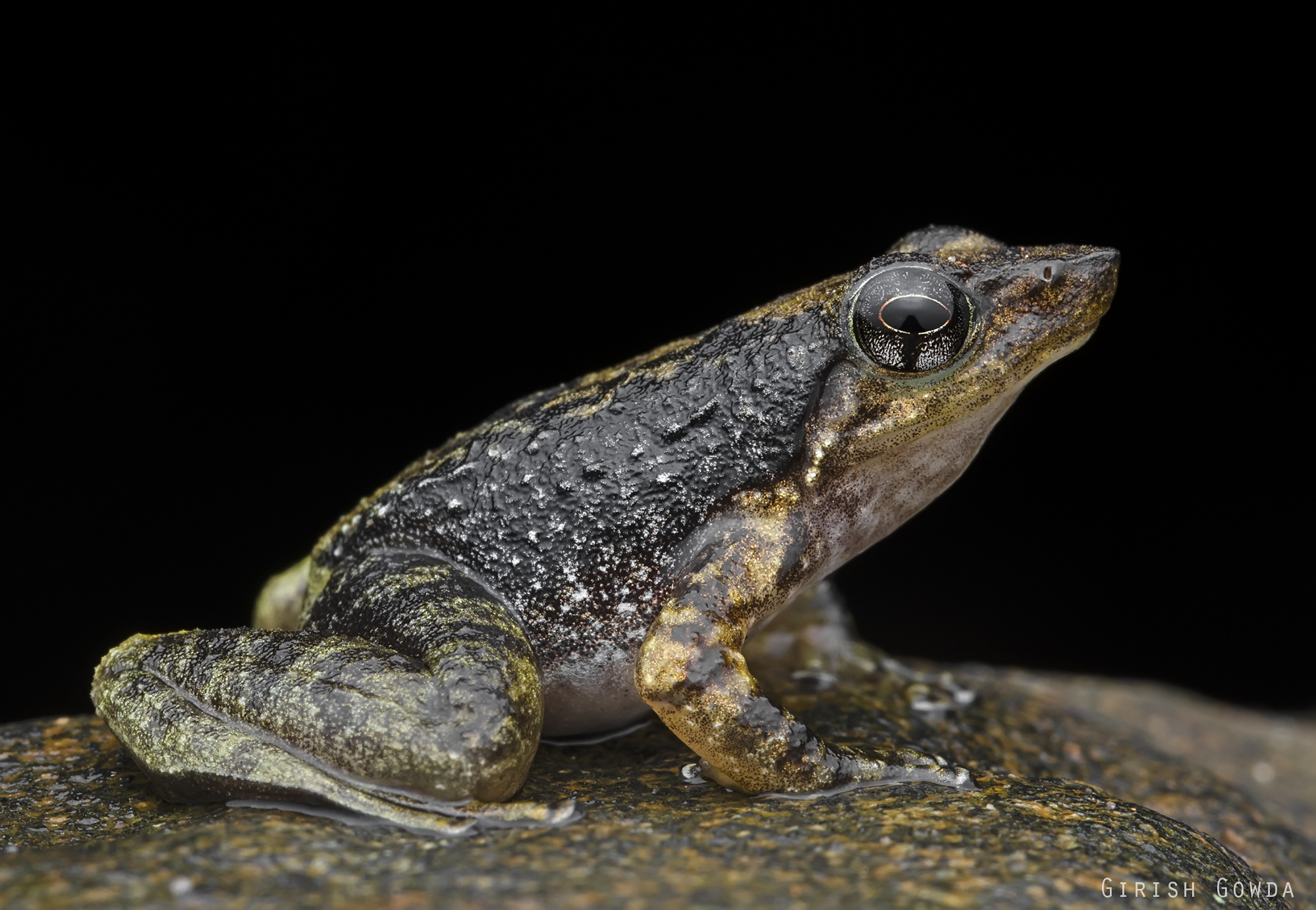

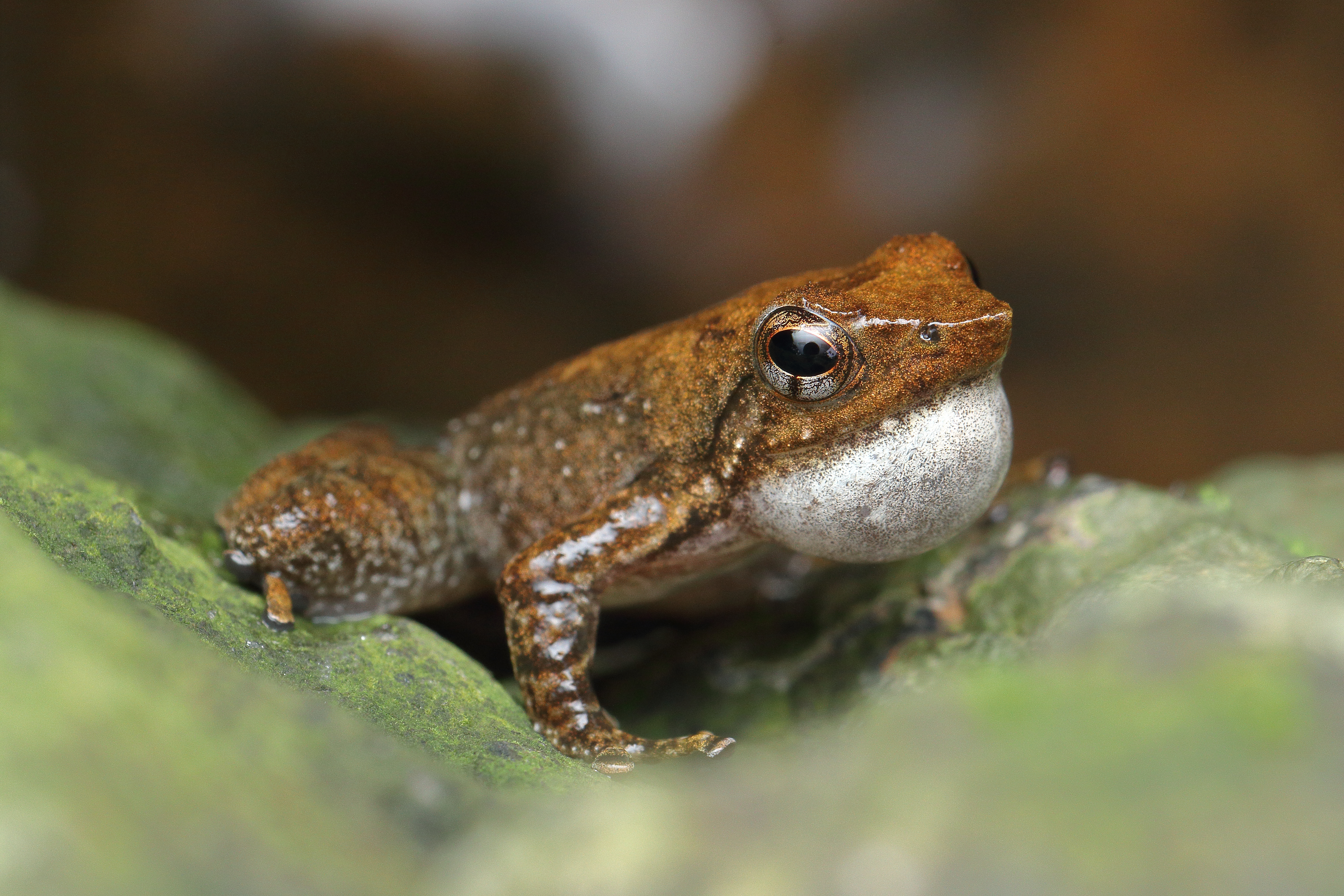

Conservation status
- Vulnerable (IUCN 3.1)

Scientific classification
- Kingdom: Animalia
- Phylum: Chordata
- Class: Amphibia
- Order: Anura
- Family: Micrixalidae
- Genus: Micrixalus
- Species: M. kottigeharensis

Binomial name
- Micrixalus kottigeharensis (Rao, 1937)

Synonyms
- Philautus kottigeharensis Rao, 1937; Micrixalus narainensis (Rao, 1937); Micrixalus swamianus (Rao, 1937)

= Micrixalus kottigeharensis =

Species of amphibian

Micrixalus kottigeharensis (commonly known as Kottigehar dancing frog, Kottigehar bubble-nest frog or Kottigehar torrent frog) is a species of frog in the family Micrixalidae. It is endemic to the Western Ghats in Karnataka, India. It is one of the "Top 100 Evolutionarily Distinct and Globally Endangered (EDGE) Amphibians". The specific name means "from Kottigehara". The tadpoles of Micrixalus kottigeharensis are fossorial. Females have been observed excavating egg-laying cavities using their hind limbs, with recorded cavity depths of approximately 32 mm.

== Taxonomy ==
Until 2014, both Micrixalus narainensis and Micrixalus swamianus were considered separate species, but have since been classified as junior synonyms of M. kottigeharensis based on phylogenetic analyses.

== Description ==
Male Micrixalus kottigeharensis grow to a snout–vent length of 22–24 mm (0.87–0.94 in) and females to 28–33 mm (1.1–1.3 in).

== Habitat ==
The preferred habitat of Micrixalus kottigeharensis are fast-flowing streams in primary and secondary forests. It is threatened by habitat loss. The species is most often found in shaded, structurally complex stream habitats and is particularly associated with emergent rocks, riffles and braided sections

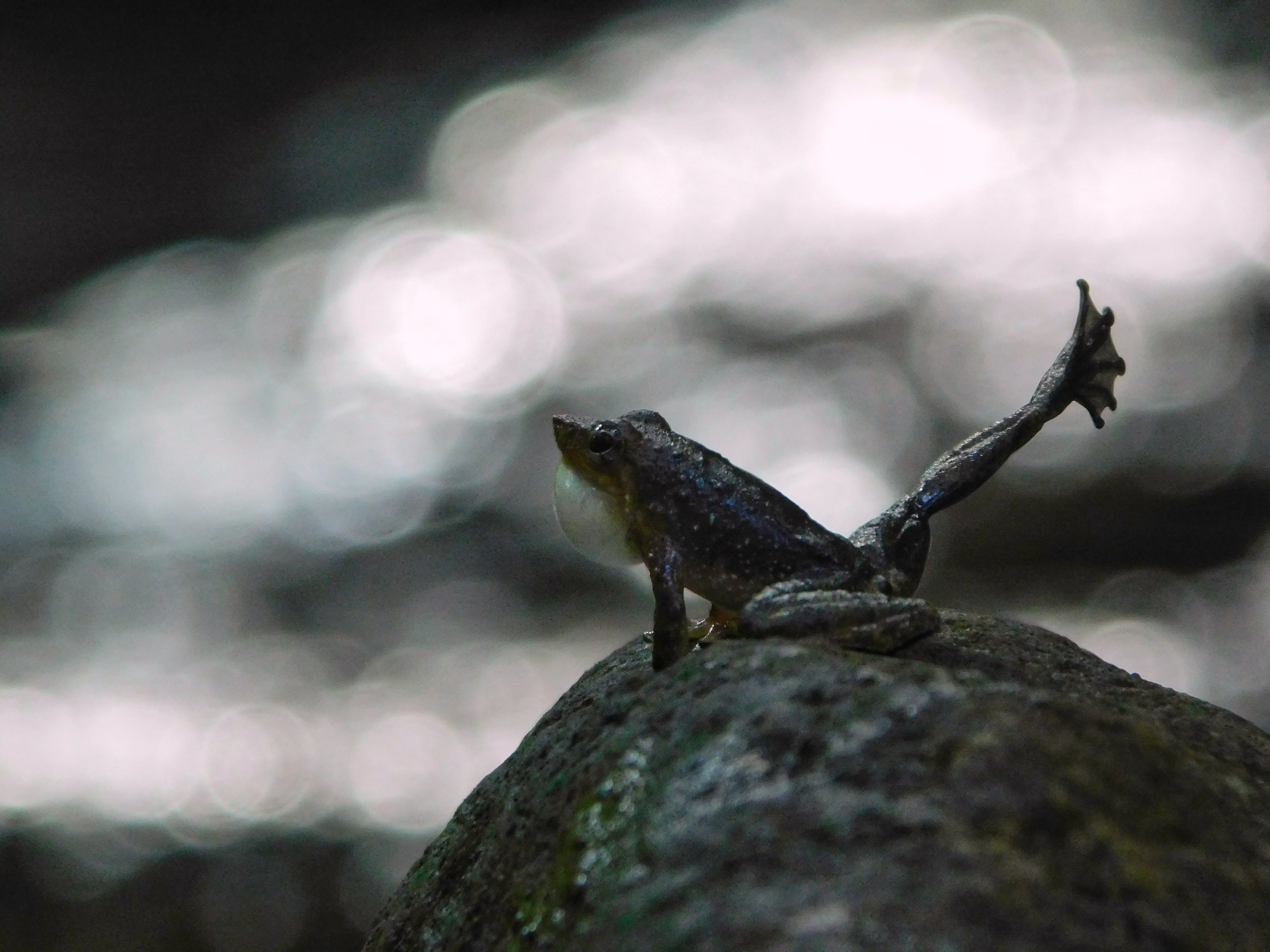
Micrixalus kottigeharensis displaying foot-flagging behaviour sitting on an emergent rock in a perennial stream

== Geographic distribution ==
Endemic to the central Western Ghats of India.
