= Micrixalus nigraventris =

Scientific classification
- Kingdom: Animalia
- Phylum: Chordata
- Class: Amphibia
- Order: Anura
- Family: Micrixalidae
- Genus: Micrixalus
- Species: M. nigraventris

Binomial name
- Micrixalus nigraventris Biju et al., 2014

Species of amphibian

Micrixalus nigraventris is a species of frogs in the family Micrixalidae. It is endemic to the Western Ghats, India.

Its natural habitats are subtropical or tropical moist lowland forest and rivers.
