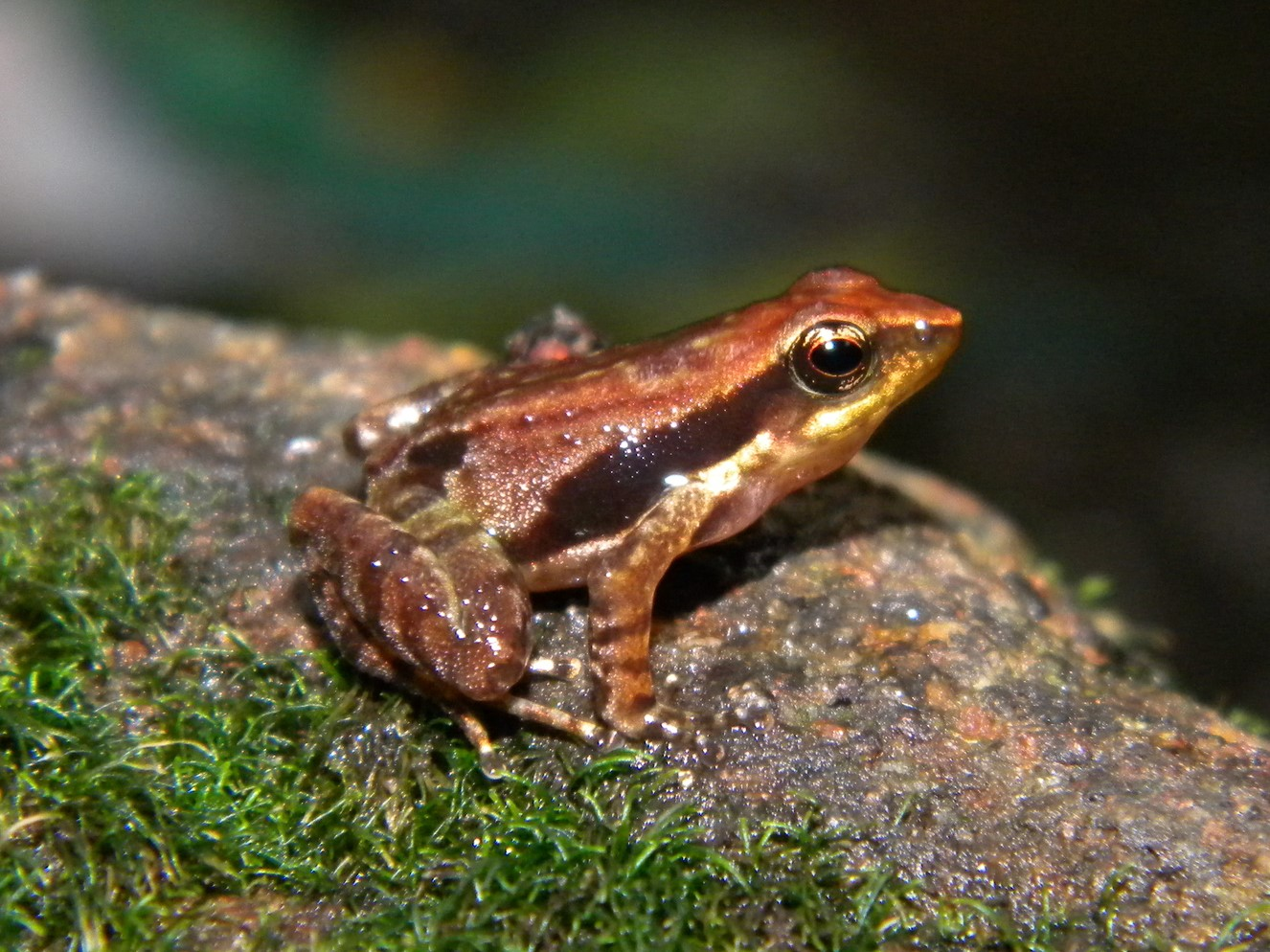

Scientific classification
- Kingdom: Animalia
- Phylum: Chordata
- Class: Amphibia
- Order: Anura
- Family: Micrixalidae
- Genus: Micrixalus
- Species: M. sali

Binomial name
- Micrixalus sali Biju et al., 2014

= Micrixalus sali =

Species of amphibian

Micrixalus sali, commonly known as Sali's dancing frog, is a species of frog in the family Micrixalidae. It is endemic to the Western Ghats, India. The preferred habitats of M. sali are damp leaf litter, exposed streambeds, and brooks in moist evergreen forests.

The species is named after famous wild life photographer Sali Palode, who documented the pygmy elephant Kallana in Kerala, India, as a token of appreciation for his support of field studies in the Western Ghats area.
