= Yogesh Shouche =

Yogesh S. Shouche
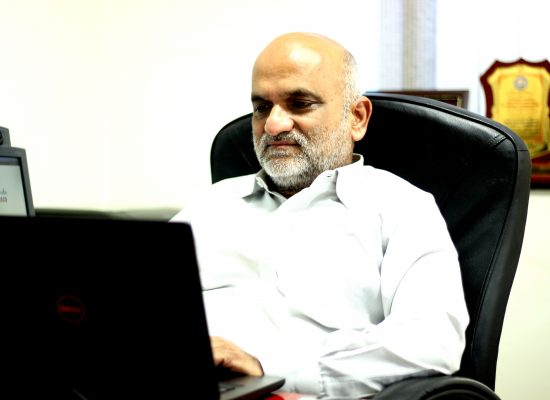
- Born: 24 October 1960 (age 65); Pune India
- Education: Indian Institute of Science
- Scientific career
- Fields: Microbiology
- Workplaces: National Centre for Cell Science

Yogesh S. Shouche is an Indian microbiologist. Currently, he is Principal Investigator of National Centre for Microbial Resource (formerly known as the Microbial Culture Collection) at the National Centre for Cell Science, Pune, India.

== Career ==
He did his masters' studies in Microbiology, at the Garware College, affiliated to the University of Pune in 1982. He did his doctoral studies at the Molecular Biophysics Unit, Indian Institute of Science, Bangalore, India in 1989 on 'Mapping of B and non B Confirmations in form V DNA'. He then joined the Institute of Microbial Technology, (Imtech), Chandigarh, India in 1989. During the years 1993-94, he worked as a postdoctoral fellow at the Department of Microbiology, GBF (National Research Center for Biotechnology), Germany.

He has served on the editorial boards of Current Science, Scientific Reports and PLOS One.

== Publications ==
- Complete list of Google Scholar list of publications, see "Google Scholar".
- Complete list of PubMed list of publications, see "PubMed".
