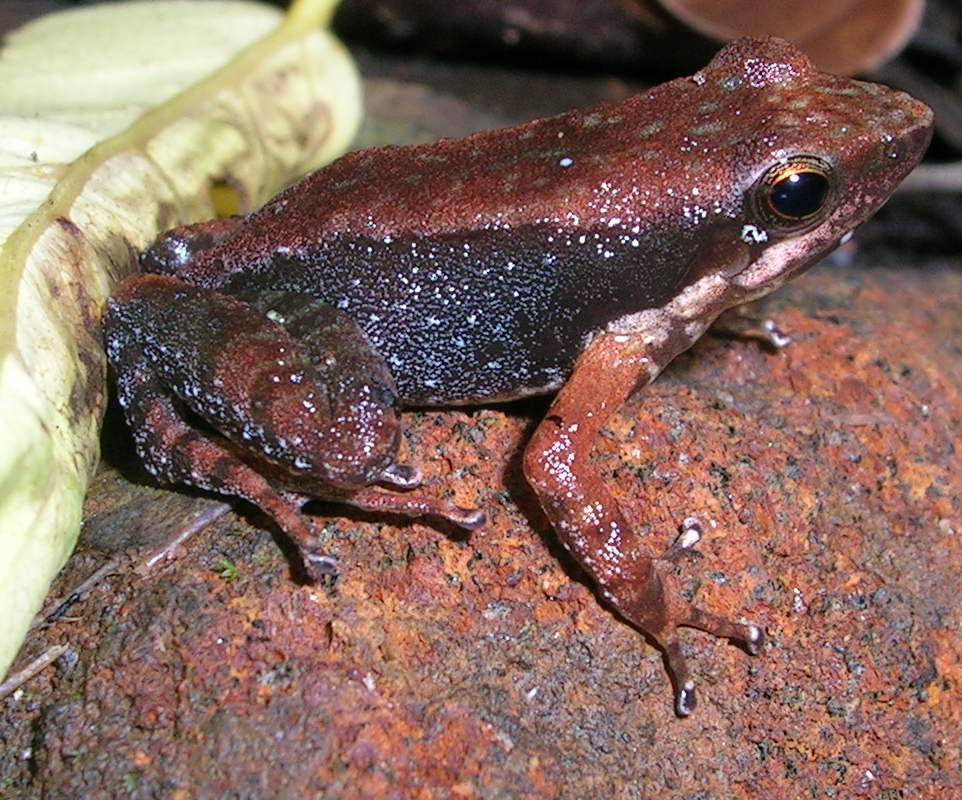

Conservation status
- Near Threatened (IUCN 3.1)

Scientific classification
- Kingdom: Animalia
- Phylum: Chordata
- Class: Amphibia
- Order: Anura
- Family: Micrixalidae
- Genus: Micrixalus
- Species: M. fuscus

Binomial name
- Micrixalus fuscus (Boulenger, 1882)

Synonyms
- Ixalus fuscus Boulenger, 1882

= Micrixalus fuscus =

Species of amphibian

Micrixalus fuscus (dusky torrent frog or brown tropical frog) is a species of small frog found in dense forested hill streams in the Western Ghats of India. M. herrei was formerly synonymized within this species.

== Description ==
Males measure 27.9–28.8 mm (1.10–1.13 in) and females 30.0–33.1 mm (1.18–1.30 in) in snout–vent length. Male Micrixalus fuscus have a single vocal sac, a white patch on the lower jaw, and a prominent nuptial pad on the first finger. Characteristic for the genus, they display the "foot-flagging" behavior, where males tap their hindfeet and extend it, then stretching it out and shaking the foot at prospective mates and rival males. Male-male combats also involve kicking.

Description from G. A. Boulenger's (1890) "Fauna of British India":

Snout pointed, prominent, generally longer than the orbital diameter; canthus rostralis angular: loreal region flat, vertical; nostril halfway between the eye and the tip of the snout; interorbital space as broad as the upper eyelid; tympanum small, indistinct. Toes nearly entirely webbed; disks moderate; subarticular tubercles small; a small inner metatarsal tubercle. The tibio-tarsal articulation reaches between the eye and the tip of the snout. Skin smooth above and beneath; a narrow glandular lateral fold; a fold from the eye to the shoulder. Brown or pinkish above; sides of head and body generally darker; limbs with dark cross bands; hinder side of thighs dark brown, with a more or less accentuated light median stripe; whitish beneath, marbled with brown. Male with two internal vocal sacs, the openings of which are very small. From snout to vent 1.2 inches.

== Habitat ==
The natural habitats of this species are fast-flowing streams covered by forest canopy. It is relatively abundant where it has been found.

== Diet ==
This species were found preying predominantly on Hymenoptera, Coleoptera and Diptera species since they are diurnal.
