= Minervarya dhaka =

Scientific classification
- Kingdom: Animalia
- Phylum: Chordata
- Class: Amphibia
- Order: Anura
- Family: Dicroglossidae
- Genus: Minervarya
- Species: M. dhaka

Binomial name
- Minervarya dhaka (Howlader, 2016)

Synonyms
- Fejervarya dhaka Howlader, 2016; Zakerana dhaka Howlader, 2016

Species of amphibian

Minervarya dhaka is a species of frogs found in Dhaka, Bangladesh. Specimens have been collected from the campus of Sher-e-Bangla Agricultural University in Dhaka and also from Mymensingh Division.

Other geographically proximal species are Minervarya nepalensis, Minervarya pierrei, Minervarya syhadrensis, Minervarya teraiensis, and Minervarya asmati.

== Discovery ==
It was discovered in 2016 in Dhaka, the capital of Bangladesh and a megacity. The particular frog was established to be a separate species using two mitochondrial DNA genes (12S rRNA and 16S rRNA), by research supported by the "Ecological Genetics Research Unit" in the Department of Biosciences of the University of Helsinki, Finland.
