= Cricket frog (disambiguation) =

A cricket frog (Acris) is a genus of small North American frogs in the family Hylidae.

Cricket frog may also refer to:

- Indian cricket frog (Fejervarya limnocharis), a frog in the family Dicroglossidae widely distributed in South Asia
- Nicobar cricket frog (Fejervarya nicobariensis), a frog in the family Dicroglossidae endemic to the Nicobar Islands
- Raorchestes parvulus, a frog in the family Rhacophoridae found in South East Asia
- South Asian cricket frog (Zakerana), a genus of frogs in the family Dicroglossidae found in Sri Lanka, Pakistan, Nepal, Bangladesh, Nepal and Bhutan
