= Minervarya charlesdarwini =

Charles Darwin's frog

Conservation status
- Critically Endangered (IUCN 3.1)

Scientific classification
- Kingdom: Animalia
- Phylum: Chordata
- Class: Amphibia
- Order: Anura
- Family: Dicroglossidae
- Genus: Minervarya
- Species: M. charlesdarwini

Binomial name
- Minervarya charlesdarwini (Das, 1998)

Synonyms
- Rana charlesdarwini Das, 1998; Ingerana charlesdarwini Dinesh, Radhakrishnan, Gururaja, and Bhatta, 2009

Species of amphibian

Minervarya charlesdarwini (vernacular name: Charles Darwin's frog) is a species of frogs in the family Dicroglossidae. It is endemic to the Andaman Islands, India, and is known from the South Andaman Island, Long Island, and North Andaman Island.

== Taxonomy ==
Minervarya charlesdarwini was described in 1998 as Rana charlesdarwini by Indraneil Das, but was moved to the genus Ingerana in 2006. However, this taxonomic placement was always considered uncertain. In 2022, a phylogenetic study found it to be a sister species to the Andaman frog (M. andamanensis), another endemic frog of the Andamans, and it was thus reclassified into the genus Minervarya.

Following the description of this species, specimens labelled as Rana doriae andamanensis collected by Nelson Annandale were found from the Zoological Survey of India. However, Annandale never formally described a taxon using that name, so it is an unavailable name.

== Description ==
Adult males measure 25–29 mm (1.0–1.1 in) and adult females 29–38 mm (1.1–1.5 in) in snout–vent length. The snout is rounded and has a blunt tip. The tympanum is distinct and exposed; the supra-tympanic fold is well-developed and forms a thick, fleshy ridge. The fingers have no webbing whereas the toes are partially webbed. The finger and toe tips bear swollen discs, without circum-marginal grooves. Skin has minute granules scattered all over the dorsum; the venter is smooth. Colouration is variable with three different morphs:

- The first morph is dull olive brown but has a bright orange butterfly-like marking on the dorsum behind the occiput, and a smaller spot of the same colour above the sacral region. Only very feeble black subocular spots are present, and the limbs lack barred pattern.
- The second type is light tan and has very distinct black bars on the limbs. The dorsum has only a feeble W-like marking on the mid-dorsum and two indistinct orange spots. A mid-dorsal stripe might be present. Under moist conditions, the colour turns dark brown. Males have a dark gular vocal sac.
- The third morph, which is similar to the holotype, is bright creamy white but with a dark brown patch on the dorsum as well as very thin, creamy white mid-dorsal stripe and two distinct, white subocular spots. Again, males have a dark gular vocal sac.

== Habitat and conservation ==
Minervarya charlesdarwini have been found in primary evergreen and secondary forests at elevations below 500 m (1,600 ft). The eggs are laid in water-filled tree holes. It is threatened by habitat loss (clear-cutting). The type series was collected in the Mount Harriet National Park, and the species is also known from the Saddle Peak National Park.

== Reproduction ==
In 2024, scientists Sathyabhama Das Biju and Sonali Garg, both of Harvard University, conducted a study on the reproduction habits of M. charlesdarwini and found that the frogs mate upside down. During mating the male frog grasps the female frog in the amplexus at which point the female frog leaves the pool of water and turns around. The female frog then backs up and lays her eggs on the inner wall of a tree.
