= Long-legged frog =

Long-legged frog may refer to:

- Long-legged cricket frog (Zakerana syhadrensis), a frog in the family Dicroglossidae native to India, Sri Lanka, Pakistan, Nepal and Bangladesh
- Long-legged wood frog (Rana macrocnemis), a frog in the family Ranidae found in Armenia, Azerbaijan, Georgia, Iran, Russia, Turkey, and Turkmenistan
