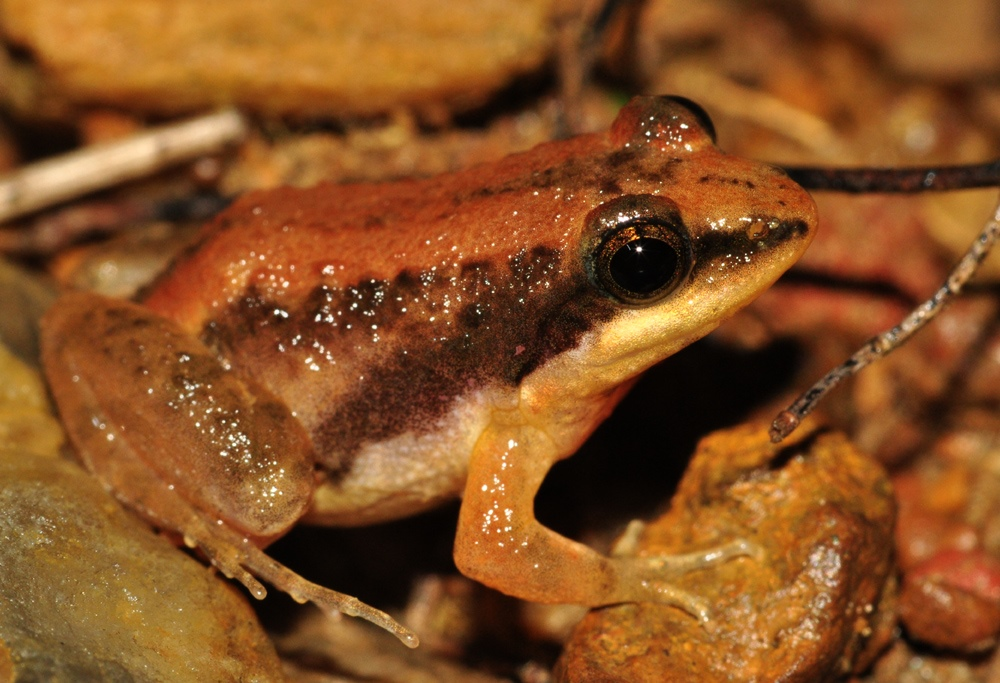
- Minervarya sahyadris

Conservation status
- Endangered (IUCN 3.1)

Scientific classification
- Kingdom: Animalia
- Phylum: Chordata
- Class: Amphibia
- Order: Anura
- Family: Dicroglossidae
- Genus: Minervarya
- Species: M. sahyadris

Binomial name
- Minervarya sahyadris Dubois, Ohler, and Biju, 2001

Synonyms
- Fejervarya sahyadris (Dubois, Ohler, and Biju, 2001)

= Minervarya sahyadris =

Species of frog

Minervarya sahyadris, also known as the small cricket frog, is a species of frog in the family Dicroglossidae. It is endemic to central Western Ghats of Kerala and Karnataka in India.

== Distribution ==
Minervarya sahyadris is endemic to central Western Ghats and is known from Gundia River and adjacent areas in Karnataka and Kannur, Kasaragod, Kozhikode and neighboring areas in Kerala at elevations between 40 and 200 m (130 and 660 ft) above sea level.

== Habitat ==
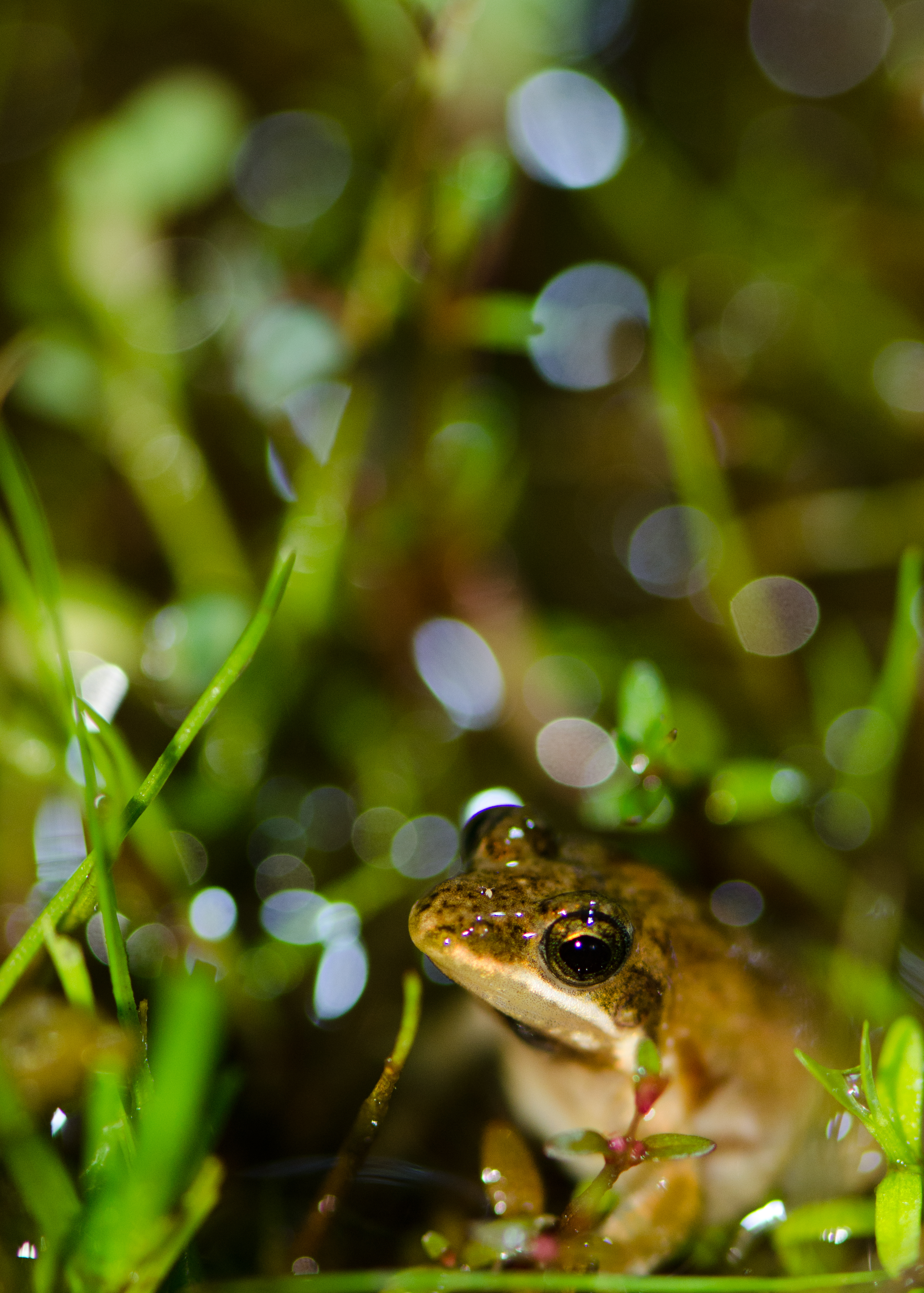
Fejervarya sahyadris from Madayippara, Kerala

It is a semi-aquatic, terrestrial species. It has been found from grassy areas adjacent to paddy fields, disturbed (open) moist tropical forest, stream banks and abandoned quarries. It is threatened by habitat loss.

== Description ==
This species is about 22 mm in length and is nocturnal. It is seen in loose groups; key identifying features include pointed snout, presence of rictal gland, supratympanic fold from back of eye to shoulder, mid dorsum reddish to reddish brown in colour and minimal webbing in feet.
