= F. nepalensis =

F. nepalensis may refer to:

- Fejervarya nepalensis, a frog native to Asia
- Frullania nepalensis, a liverwort with thin, leaf-like flaps on either side of the stem
