= Pegu frog =

Pegu frog may refer to:

- Pegu rice frog, a frog found in Asia
- Pegu torrent frog, a frog found in Asia
- Pegu wart frog, a frog endemic to the Western Ghats in southern India
