= Philautus cardamonus =

Conservation status
- Endangered (IUCN 3.1)

Scientific classification
- Kingdom: Animalia
- Phylum: Chordata
- Class: Amphibia
- Order: Anura
- Family: Rhacophoridae
- Genus: Philautus
- Species: P. cardamonus

Binomial name
- Philautus cardamonus Ohler, Swan & Daltry, 2002

Species of amphibian

Philautus cardamonus is a species of frogs in the family Rhacophoridae.

It is endemic to Cambodia, only known from the vicinity of the type locality in the Phnom Sankos Wildlife Sanctuary in the Cardamom Mountains. This frog has been observed between 1,000 and 1,700 meters above sea level.

This frog can measure as much as 19.3 mm in snout-vent length. The skin of the dorsum is tan and dark brown in color. The tympanum is also dark brown. The throat and chest have white and dark brown pigmentation. The front legs are short and thick.

This frog lives in evergreen forests. Scientists believe this frog undergoes direct development, hatching from its egg as a froglet with no free-swimming tadpole stage, but this has not been directly observed.

This frog is in danger of dying out because of its limited range. Because this frog lives high in the hills, it might not be able to travel between fragmented habitats, especially when there has been extensive logging in the lowlands in between.
