= Ophryophryne hansi =

Conservation status
- Data Deficient (IUCN 3.1)

Scientific classification
- Kingdom: Animalia
- Phylum: Chordata
- Class: Amphibia
- Order: Anura
- Family: Megophryidae
- Genus: Ophryophryne
- Species: O. hansi

Binomial name
- Ophryophryne hansi Ohler, 2003

Species of frog

Ophryophryne hansi is a species of frog in the family Megophryidae. It is found in Cambodia, Laos, and Vietnam. Its natural habitats are subtropical or tropical moist lowland forests and rivers. It is threatened by habitat loss.
