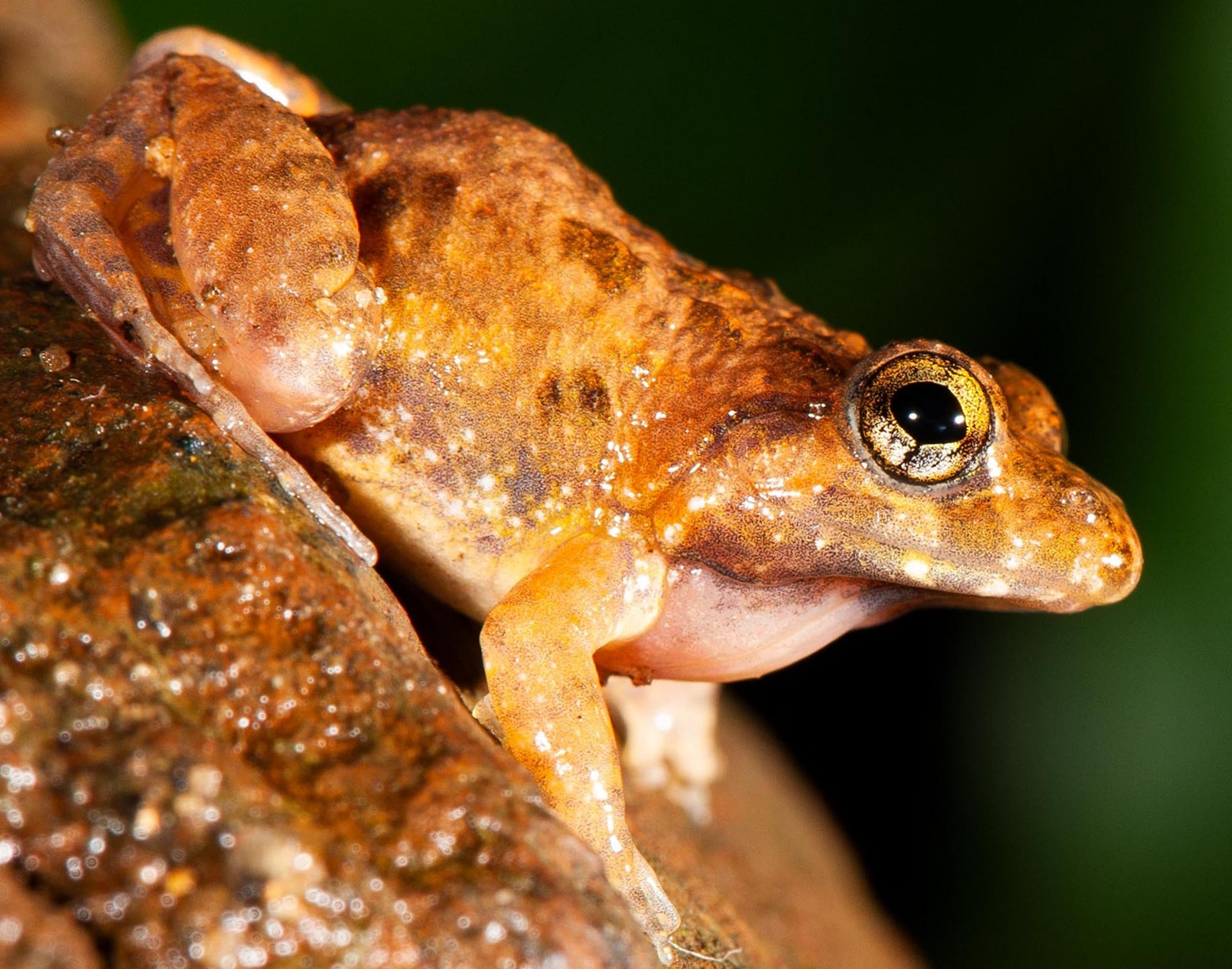
- Dorsal view of M. pentali

Scientific classification
- Kingdom: Animalia
- Phylum: Chordata
- Class: Amphibia
- Order: Anura
- Family: Dicroglossidae
- Genus: Minervarya
- Species: M. pentali

Binomial name
- Minervarya pentali Garg and Biju, 2021
- Approximate distribution Range

= Minervarya pentali =

Species of frog

Minervarya pentali, or Pental's Minervaryan frog, is a species of frog in the fork-tongued frog family, Dicroglossidae. It is endemic to the Western Ghats in India.

== Etymology ==
The species is named pentali after Deepak Pental, plant geneticist and former vice-chancellor of Delhi University, in recognition of his assistance in setting up the Systematics Lab at the university. The generic name Minervarya is a portmanteau of the Latin word "minimus", which means "smallest", and Fejervarya, which is Minervarya‘s sister genus. The name also alludes to the Ancient Roman goddess Minerva - the frogs' behaviour of suddenly jumping up seemingly from mud on the ground is reminiscent of the goddess, who burst suddenly out of her father Jupiter's head, fully clad in armour.

== Description ==
M. pentali is smaller than other Minervarya species, with males measuring 20 mm and females measuring 25 mm from snout to vent. The skin is folded and granulated. The upper parts of the body are greyish-brown and have the texture of shagreen, while the underparts are smooth and generally paler. The throat is flesh-coloured, and the calling patch is black. A yellow-grey line runs down the middle of the back. The males produce a pulsating call at regular intervals. The tongue is notched at the tip.

== Behaviour ==
=== Call ===
Male M. pentali produce a pulsating call, which they repeat at regular intervals. Each call, which has 19 pulses on average, lasts for roughly one-fifths of a second. Calls are made from 6 PM to 10 PM.

=== Breeding ===
The breeding season is from July to September. During this season, males congregate in large numbers in grasses and around water bodies.

== Distribution and habitat ==
M. pentali is endemic to the southern Western Ghats, where it is widespread and found from sea level up to an elevation of 220 m. Its range extends from Kerala's Kozhikode district in the north to Tamil Nadu's Kanyakumari district in the south. The frogs are found in vegetated wayside areas, plantations, irrigated fields and near natural water sources; they are not recorded from forested areas.
