= Minervarya kalinga =

Conservation status
- Least Concern (IUCN 3.1)

Scientific classification
- Kingdom: Animalia
- Phylum: Chordata
- Class: Amphibia
- Order: Anura
- Family: Dicroglossidae
- Genus: Minervarya
- Species: M. kalinga

Binomial name
- Minervarya kalinga (Raj, Dinesh, Das, Dutta, Kar, and Mohapatra, 2018)

Synonyms
- Fejervarya kalinga Raj, Dinesh, Das, Dutta, Kar, and Mohapatra, 2018; Minervarya kalinga Amphibian Species of the World (11 June 2018)

Species of frog

Minervarya kalinga, the Kalinga cricket frog or Kalinga rice frog, is a species of frog in the family Dicroglossidae. It is endemic to India.

== Habitat ==
This frog lives in several types of montane forests. It has been found in a specific secondary forest called Soppinabetta. Scientists have observed this frog between 500 and 1210 meters above sea level.

Scientists recorded this frog in two protected places: Papikonda National Park and Satpura Tiger Reserve.

== Reproduction ==
This frog lays eggs at the edges of streams, in paddy fields, and in ditches and swamps.

== Threats ==
The IUCN classifies this frog as least concern of extinction. In the Eastern Ghats, it is subject to habitat loss in favor of slash-and burn architecture. In other areas, bauxite mining causes habitat loss.

== Original description ==
- Raj P; Dinesh KP; Sas A; Dutta SK; Kar NB; Mohapatra PP (2018). "Two new species of cricket frogs of the genus Fejervarya Bolkay, 1915 (Anura: Dicroglossidae) from the Peninsular India". Records of the Zoological Survey of India (Abstract and references). 118: 1–21. doi:10.26515/rzsi/v118/i1/2018/121436.
