= Ophryophryne microstoma =

Conservation status
- Least Concern (IUCN 3.1)

Scientific classification
- Kingdom: Animalia
- Phylum: Chordata
- Class: Amphibia
- Order: Anura
- Family: Megophryidae
- Genus: Ophryophryne
- Species: O. microstoma

Binomial name
- Ophryophryne microstoma Boulenger, 1903

Synonyms
- Ophryophryne poilani Bourret, 1937

Species of frog

Ophryophryne microstoma is a species of frog in the family Megophryidae. It is found in Cambodia, China, Laos, Thailand, and Vietnam. Its natural habitats are subtropical or tropical moist lowland forests, subtropical or tropical moist montane forests, rivers, and swamps. It is threatened by habitat loss.
