= Minervarya chiangmaiensis =

Scientific classification
- Kingdom: Animalia
- Phylum: Chordata
- Class: Amphibia
- Order: Anura
- Family: Dicroglossidae
- Genus: Minervarya
- Species: M. chiangmaiensis

Binomial name
- Minervarya chiangmaiensis (Suwannapoom, 2016)

Synonyms
- Fejervarya chiangmaiensis Suwannapoom, 2016

Species of frog

Minervarya chiangmaiensis, commonly known as the Chiang Mai rain-pool frog, is a species of frog in the family Dicroglossidae. The holotype specimen was collected in Ban Monjong, Omkoi District, southern Chiang Mai Province, northern Thailand.

== Sources ==
- Chatmongkon SUWANNAPOOM, Zhi-Yong YUAN, Nikolay A. POYARKOV Jr., Fang YAN, et al. A new species of genus Fejervarya (Anura: Dicroglossidae) from northern Thailand[J]. 动物学研究, 0, (): 33-. http://www.zoores.ac.cn/CN/abstract/abstract3759.shtml
