= Minervarya marathi =

Scientific classification
- Kingdom: Animalia
- Phylum: Chordata
- Class: Amphibia
- Order: Anura
- Family: Dicroglossidae
- Genus: Minervarya
- Species: M. marathi

Binomial name
- Minervarya marathi (Phuge, Dinesh, Bhakare, Andhale and Pandit 2019)

Synonyms
- Fejervarya marathi Phuge, Dinesh, Bhakare, Andhale and Pandit 2019

Species of amphibian

Minervarya marathi is a species of frog native to Maharashtra, India. They live near areas of water like paddy fields and also grasslands. The species was discovered by researchers from the Zoological Survey of India and Savitribai Phule Pune University.

== Etymology ==
The frog is named after the local language, Marathi.
