= Minervarya nicobariensis =

Conservation status
- Endangered (IUCN 3.1)

Scientific classification
- Kingdom: Animalia
- Phylum: Chordata
- Class: Amphibia
- Order: Anura
- Family: Dicroglossidae
- Genus: Minervarya
- Species: M. nicobariensis

Binomial name
- Minervarya nicobariensis (Stoliczka, 1870)

Synonyms
- Rana gracilis var. nicobariensis Stoliczka, 1870; Fejervarya nicobariensis (Stoliczka, 1870)

Species of amphibian

Minervarya nicobariensis, the Nicobar frog or Nicobar cricket-frog, is a species of frog endemic to the Nicobar Islands of India. In the past it has been considered to be the same species as Fejervarya andamanensis from the neighbouring Andaman Islands, but is now regarded a valid species. It is restricted to the central and northern group of Nicobar Islands. It is relatively common in suitable habitat, particularly on Car Nicobar island. Its preferred habitat are grasslands, where the species breeds in the rainwater puddles. On Car Nicobar, it also occurs coastal wetlands and along newly cleared forest trails.
