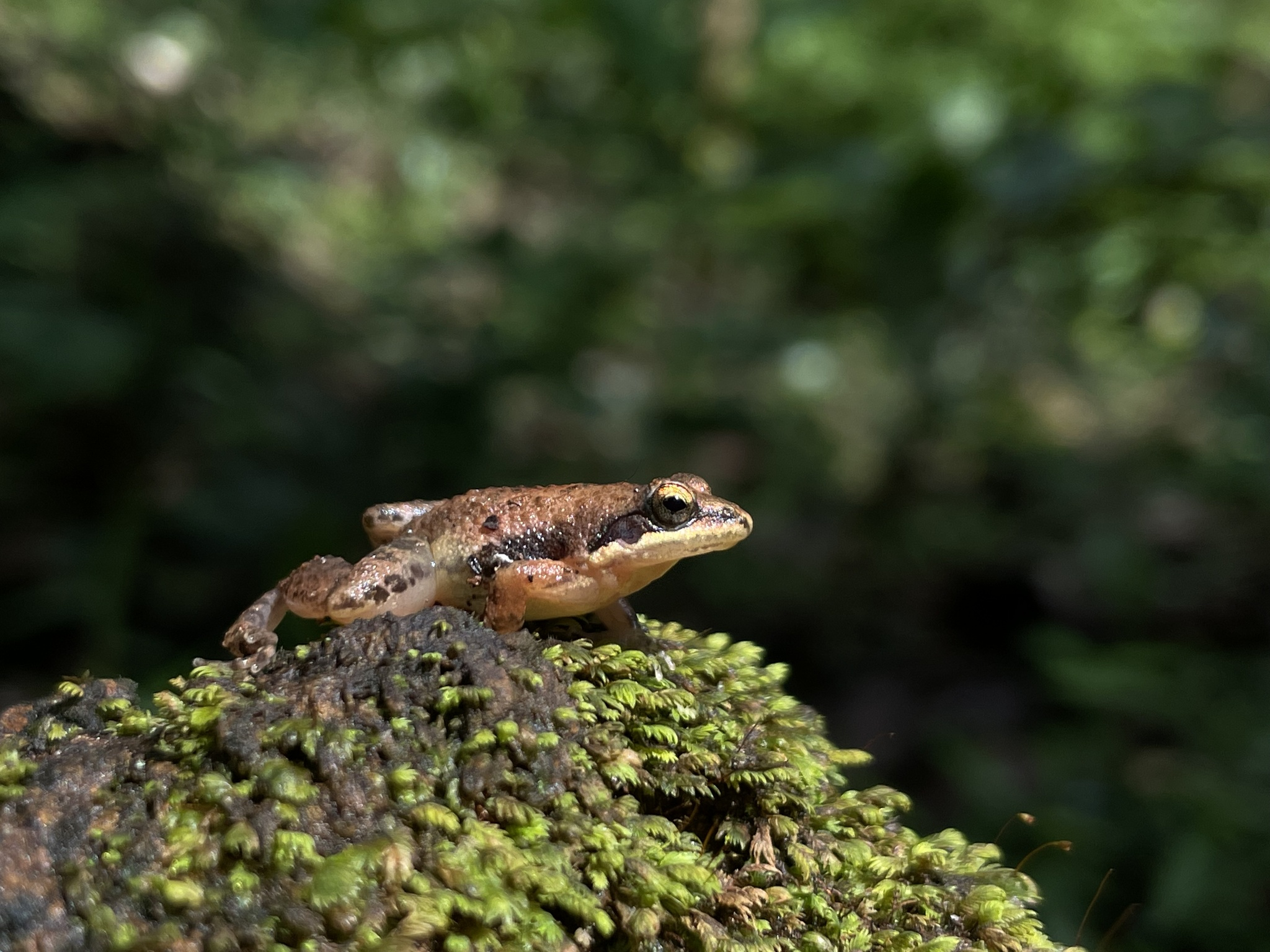
- From Sawantwadi, Sindhudurg, Maharashtra.

Conservation status
- Least Concern (IUCN 3.1)

Scientific classification
- Kingdom: Animalia
- Phylum: Chordata
- Class: Amphibia
- Order: Anura
- Family: Dicroglossidae
- Genus: Minervarya
- Species: M. gomantaki

Binomial name
- Minervarya gomantaki (Dinesh, Vijayakumar, Channakeshavamurthy, Torsekar, Kulkarni, and Shanker, 2015)

Synonyms
- Fejervarya gomantaki Dinesh, Vijayakumar, Channakeshavamurthy, Torsekar, Kulkarni, and Shanker, 2015

= Minervarya gomantaki =

Species of frog

Minervarya gomantaki, previously in the genus Fejervarya, is a species of frog, endemic to the Western Ghats region of India. It is also known as the Goan cricket frog or the Gomantak white lipped cricket Frog.

== Habitat ==
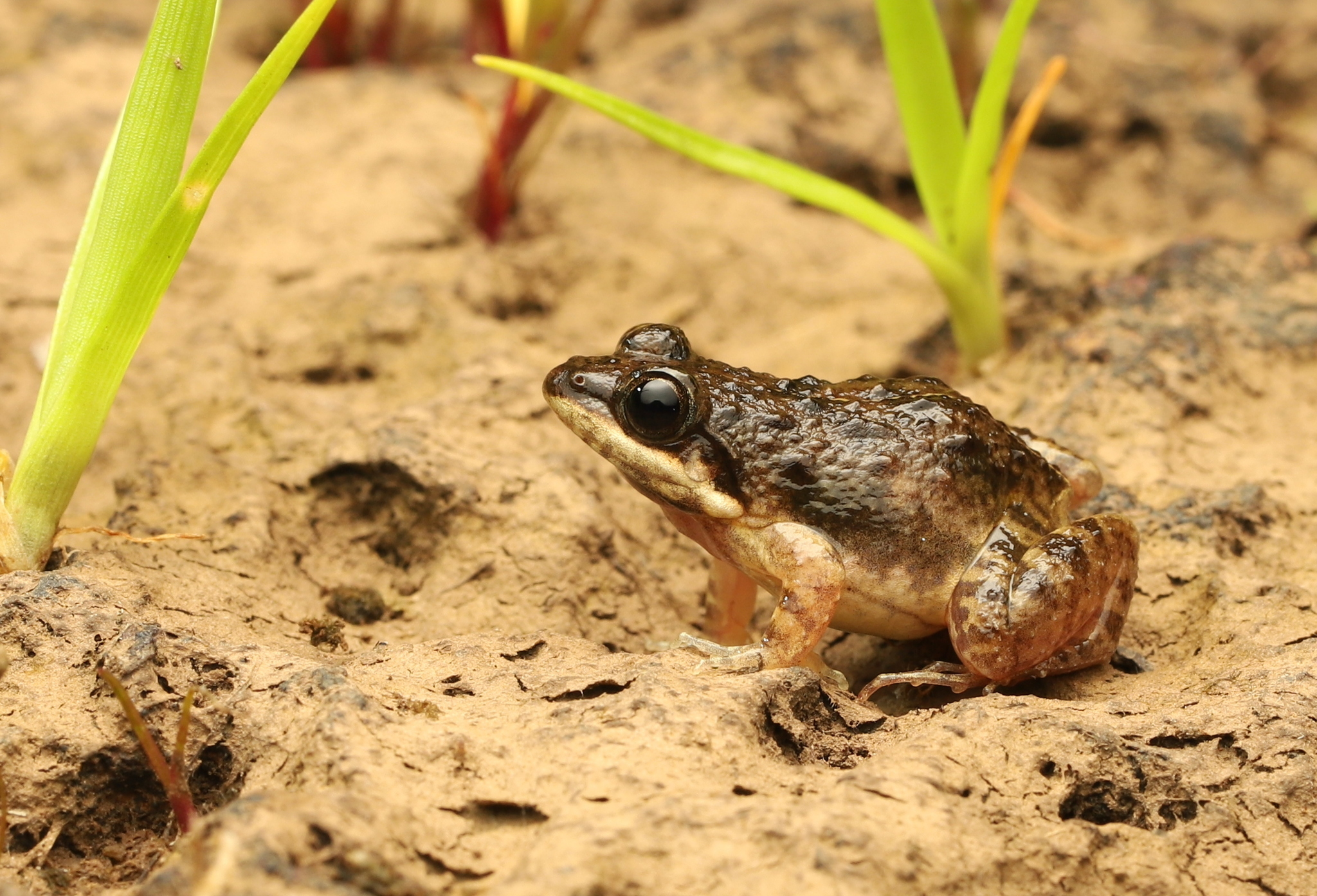
From Devihasol, Maharashtra.

This frog lives in grasslands surrounded by forest, where it is found in mud, ponds, temporary ponds, paddy fields, and puddles. It has also been observed on cashew plantations, indicating it has some tolerance to habitat disturbance. Scientists observed this frog between 50 and 800 meters above sea level.

This frog has been reported from several protected areas: Bondla Wildlife Sanctuary, Tillari Conservation Reserve, Sahyadri Tiger Reserve, and Phansad Wildlife Sanctuary.

== Threats ==
The IUCN classifies this frog as least concern of extinction. What threat it faces comes from agricultural pesticides, climate change, which could alter habitat and breeding areas, and the fungus Batrachochytrium dendrobatidis, which scientists have observed on other frogs in Minervarya. B. dendrobatidis causes the fungal disease chytridiomycosis, which has killed many amphibians.
