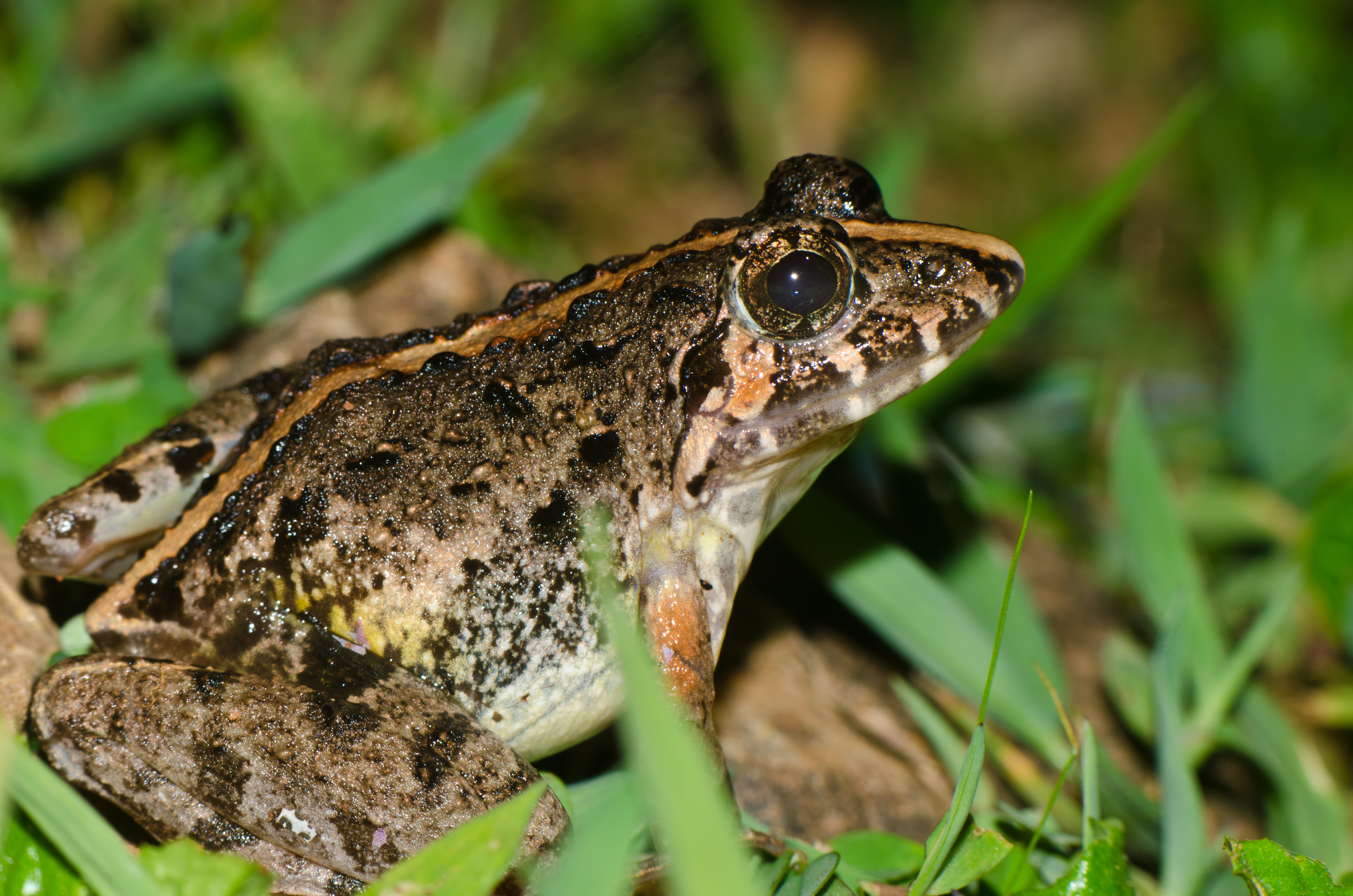

Conservation status
- Least Concern (IUCN 3.1)

Scientific classification
- Kingdom: Animalia
- Phylum: Chordata
- Class: Amphibia
- Order: Anura
- Family: Dicroglossidae
- Genus: Minervarya
- Species: M. mysorensis

Binomial name
- Minervarya mysorensis (Rao, 1922)

Synonyms
- Rana limnocharis mysorensis Rao, 1922; Rana (Hylorana) sauriceps Rao, 1937; Rana (Tomopterna) parambikulamana Rao, 1937; Rana (Fejervarya) sauriceps Dubois, 1984; Euphlyctis limnocharis mysorensis Poynton and Broadley, 1985; Limnonectes (Fejervarya) paramkibulamana Dubois, 1987; Limnonectes (Fejervarya) sauriceps Dubois, 1987; Limnonectes mysorensis Dutta and Singh, 1996; Fejervarya mysorensis Iskandar, 1998; Fejervarya sauriceps Iskandar, 1998; Fejervarya parambikulamana Iskandar, 1998; Tomopterna parambikulamana Chanda, 2002; Sphaerotheca parambikulamana Das and Dutta, 2007; Fejervarya kudremukhensis Kuramoto, Joshy, Kurabayashi, and Sumida, 2008; Zakerana mysorensis Howlader, 2011; Zakerana sauriceps Howlader, 2011; Zakerana kudremukhensis Howlader, 2011; Zakerana parambikulamana Howlader, 2011; Minervarya kudremukhensis Sanchez, Biju, Islam, Hasan, Ohler, Vences, and Kurabayashi, 2018; Minervarya parambikulamana Sanchez et al., 2018; Minervarya sauriceps Sanchez et al., 2018

= Minervarya mysorensis =

Mysore frog

Species of amphibian

Minervarya mysorensis (Mysore frog) is a species of frog that is endemic to India. It is known from its type locality, Jog in Shimoga district, Karnataka state, and has recently been found in locations south to Kerala.

A 2021 phylogenetic study found that Minervarya mysorensis was indistinguishable from three other species in its genus, M. parambikulamana, M. kudremukhensis, and M. sauriceps, which have been folded into this species as junior synonyms.
