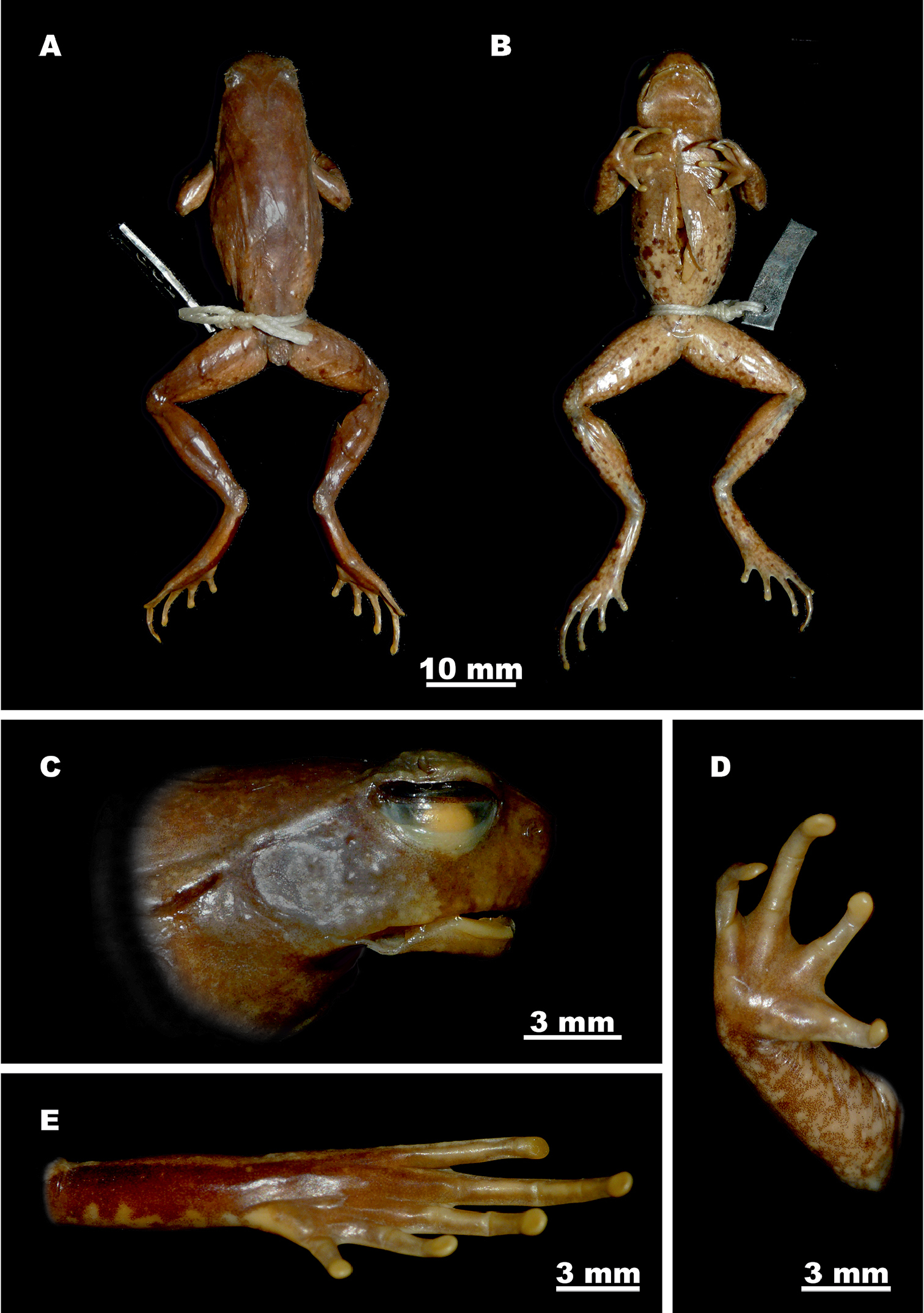

Conservation status
- Endangered (IUCN 3.1)

Scientific classification
- Kingdom: Animalia
- Phylum: Chordata
- Class: Amphibia
- Order: Anura
- Family: Megophryidae
- Genus: Ophryophryne
- Species: O. gerti

Binomial name
- Ophryophryne gerti Ohler, 2003

Synonyms
- Megophyrys (Ophryophryne) gerti Mahony, Foley, Biju, and Teeling, 2017

= Ophryophryne gerti =

Species of amphibian

Ophryophryne gerti, commonly called Gert's mountain toad, is a species of frog in the family Megophryidae. It is found in Vietnam, where it is known from the Lang Bian Plateau of Lam Dong Province, and Di Linh Plateau. Records from other locations, including Laos, require further confirmation. Its natural habitats are subtropical or tropical moist lowland forests and rivers. It is threatened by habitat loss.
