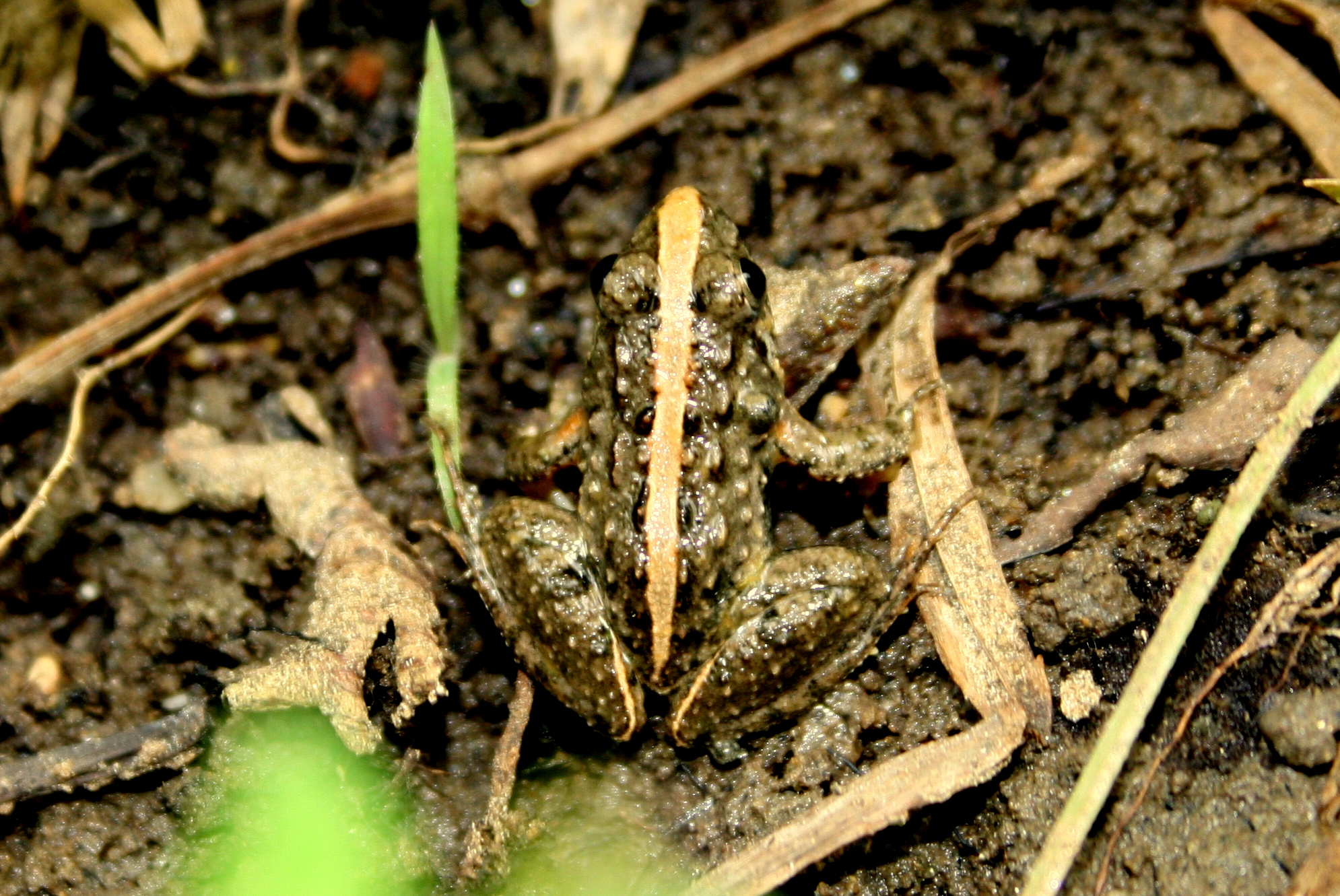

Conservation status
- Least Concern (IUCN 3.1)

Scientific classification
- Domain: Eukaryota
- Kingdom: Animalia
- Phylum: Chordata
- Class: Amphibia
- Order: Anura
- Family: Dicroglossidae
- Genus: Minervarya
- Species: M. agricola

Binomial name
- Minervarya agricola (Jerdon, 1853)

Synonyms
- Rana agricola Jerdon, 1853; Minervarya granosa (Kuramoto, Joshy, Kurabayashi & Sumida, 2008); Fejervarya granosa Kuramoto, Joshy, Kurabayashi, and Sumida, 2008 "2007"; Zakerana granosa Howlader, 2011; Fejervarya agricola Ganesh, Dutta, and Chandramouli, 2017; Fejervarya granosa Dinesh, Vijayakumar, Channakeshavamurthy, Torsekar, Kulkarni, and Shanker, 2015

= Minervarya agricola =

Species of amphibian

Minervarya agricola (common name: common Indian cricket frog) is a species of frog that is native to Indian subcontinent. Earlier identified as M. granosa and Zakerana syhadrensis due to large distribution, the species was classified as a separate species in 2019.

== Distribution ==
It is a widespread species in Indian subcontinent, and found in India, Sri Lanka and Nepal.

== Ecology ==
It occupies a wide range of habitats from flooded fields and human habitation in the plains to the wet forests on the hills.
