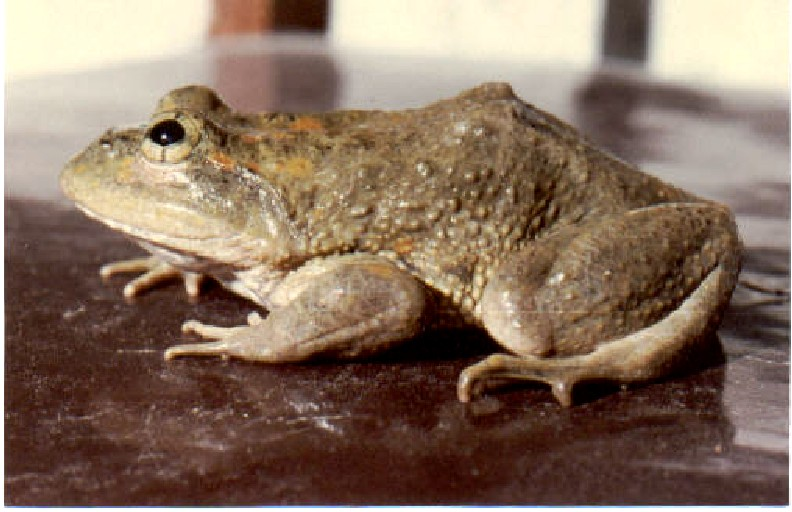

Conservation status
- Least Concern (IUCN 3.1)

Scientific classification
- Kingdom: Animalia
- Phylum: Chordata
- Class: Amphibia
- Order: Anura
- Family: Dicroglossidae
- Genus: Chrysopaa; Ohler and Dubois, 2006
- Species: C. sternosignata

Binomial name
- Chrysopaa sternosignata (Murray, 1885)

Synonyms
- Rana sternosignata Murray, 1885; Paa sternosignata (Murray, 1885); Nanorana sternosignata (Murray, 1885)

= Chrysopaa =

Genus of amphibians

Chrysopaa is a genus of frogs in the family Dicroglossidae. It is monotypic, being represented by the single species, Chrysopaa sternosignata. It is found in Balochistan, Pakistan, Kashmir (Pakistan and India) and in Afghanistan. Its common names include Baluch Mountain frog, karez frog, Malir paa frog, and Murray's frog.

Chrysopaa sternosignata is a highly aquatic frog living in rivers, swamps, and freshwater marshes. It is a relatively common species.
