= Ophryophryne synoria =

Conservation status
- Vulnerable (IUCN 3.1)

Scientific classification
- Kingdom: Animalia
- Phylum: Chordata
- Class: Amphibia
- Order: Anura
- Family: Megophryidae
- Genus: Ophryophryne
- Species: O. synoria

Binomial name
- Ophryophryne synoria Stuart, Sok, and Neang, 2006

Synonyms
- Megophrys (Ophryophryne) synoria (Stuart, Sok, and Neang, 2006)

Species of frog

Ophryophryne synoria is a species of frog in the family Megophryidae. It is only known from its type locality in eastern Cambodia (Keo Seima Wildlife Sanctuary, Mondulkiri Province) and from southern Vietnam (Bình Phước and Đồng Nai Provinces). Common names O'Reang horned frog and O'Reang mountain toad have been proposed for it.

Ophryophryne synoria occurs in hilly mixed and evergreen forests at elevations of 200–1,500 m (660–4,920 ft) above sea level. It is present in several protected areas: its type locality, Keo Seima Wildlife Sanctuary in Cambodia, and Bù Gia Mập and Cát Tiên National Parks in Vietnam.
