= Ophryophryne pachyproctus =

Conservation status
- Least Concern (IUCN 3.1)

Scientific classification
- Kingdom: Animalia
- Phylum: Chordata
- Class: Amphibia
- Order: Anura
- Family: Megophryidae
- Genus: Ophryophryne
- Species: O. pachyproctus

Binomial name
- Ophryophryne pachyproctus Kou, 1985

Species of frog

Ophryophryne pachyproctus is a species of frog in the family Megophryidae. It is found in China, Laos, Vietnam, and possibly Cambodia. Its natural habitats are subtropical or tropical moist lowland forests, subtropical or tropical moist montane forests, and rivers. It is threatened by habitat loss.
