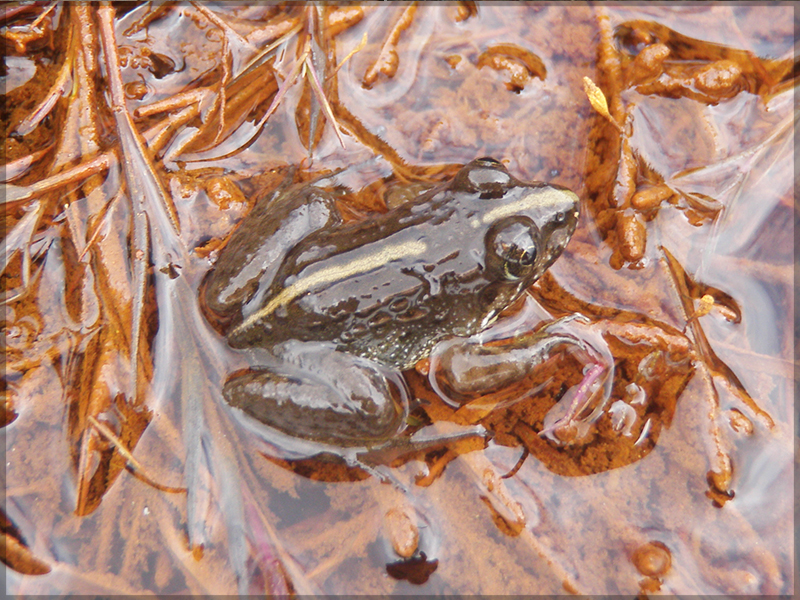

Conservation status
- Endangered (IUCN 3.1)

Scientific classification
- Kingdom: Animalia
- Phylum: Chordata
- Class: Amphibia
- Order: Anura
- Family: Dicroglossidae
- Genus: Minervarya
- Species: M. greenii

Binomial name
- Minervarya greenii (Boulenger, 1905)
- Range of F. greenii in Sri Lanka

Synonyms
- Rana greenii Boulenger, 1905; Fejervarya greenii (Boulenger, 1905); Zakerana greenii

= Minervarya greenii =

Species of amphibian

Minervarya greenii (common names: montane frog, Sri Lanka paddy field frog) is a species of frog that is endemic to the hills of central Sri Lanka. It lives in wetland habitats within montane tropical moist forests. It is threatened by habitat loss, pollution, desiccation of wetlands, forest fires as well as predation by introduced rainbow trout.
