= Rhacophorus laoshan =

Conservation status
- Data Deficient (IUCN 3.1)

Scientific classification
- Kingdom: Animalia
- Phylum: Chordata
- Class: Amphibia
- Order: Anura
- Family: Rhacophoridae
- Genus: Rhacophorus
- Species: R. laoshan

Binomial name
- Rhacophorus laoshan Mo, Jiang, Xie, and Ohler, 2008

Species of frog

Rhacophorus laoshan, the Laoshan tree frog, is a species of frog in the family Rhacophoridae. Scientists know it from the type locality: 1389 meters above sea level in Cenwangloashan Nature Reserve in China.

The adult frog measures about 35 mm in snout-vent length. The skin of the dorsum is brown in color with a ventrolateral stripe. The ventrum is gray-brown in color. The inner surfaces of the hind legs are bright tangerine orange in color.

This frog lives in the bamboo understory of forests with tall trees.

Scientists named this frog after Cenwanglaoshan Natural Preserve, where it was found.
