= Cyrtodactylus buchardi =

Conservation status
- Data Deficient (IUCN 3.1)

Scientific classification
- Kingdom: Animalia
- Phylum: Chordata
- Class: Reptilia
- Order: Squamata
- Suborder: Gekkota
- Family: Gekkonidae
- Genus: Cyrtodactylus
- Species: C. buchardi

Binomial name
- Cyrtodactylus buchardi David, Teynié & Ohler, 2004

Species of lizard

Cyrtodactylus buchardi is a species of gecko, a lizard in the family Gekkonidae. The species is endemic to Laos.

== Geographic range ==
C. buchardi is found in southern Laos, in Champasak Province.

== Etymology ==
The specific name, buchardi, is in honor of French businessman Michel Buchard for his longtime financial support of herpetology.

== Description ==
C. buchardi has a more slender body than other Cyrtodactylus, a barely visible lateral fold, a slender but short tail, only 12 subdigital lamellae beneath its 4th toe, and 25 rows of tuberculate dorsal scales. It also has no precloacal groove, three series of enlarged precloacal scales, no enlarged femoral scales, no distinctly enlarged subcaudal scales, 13-14 supralabials, a dorsal pattern made of five transversal series of irregular blotches, and a nuchal collar not reaching the posterior margin of the eyes.

== Habitat ==
The preferred natural habitat of C. buchardi is forest, at altitudes of 90–300 m (300–980 ft).

== Reproduction ==
C. buchardi is oviparous.
