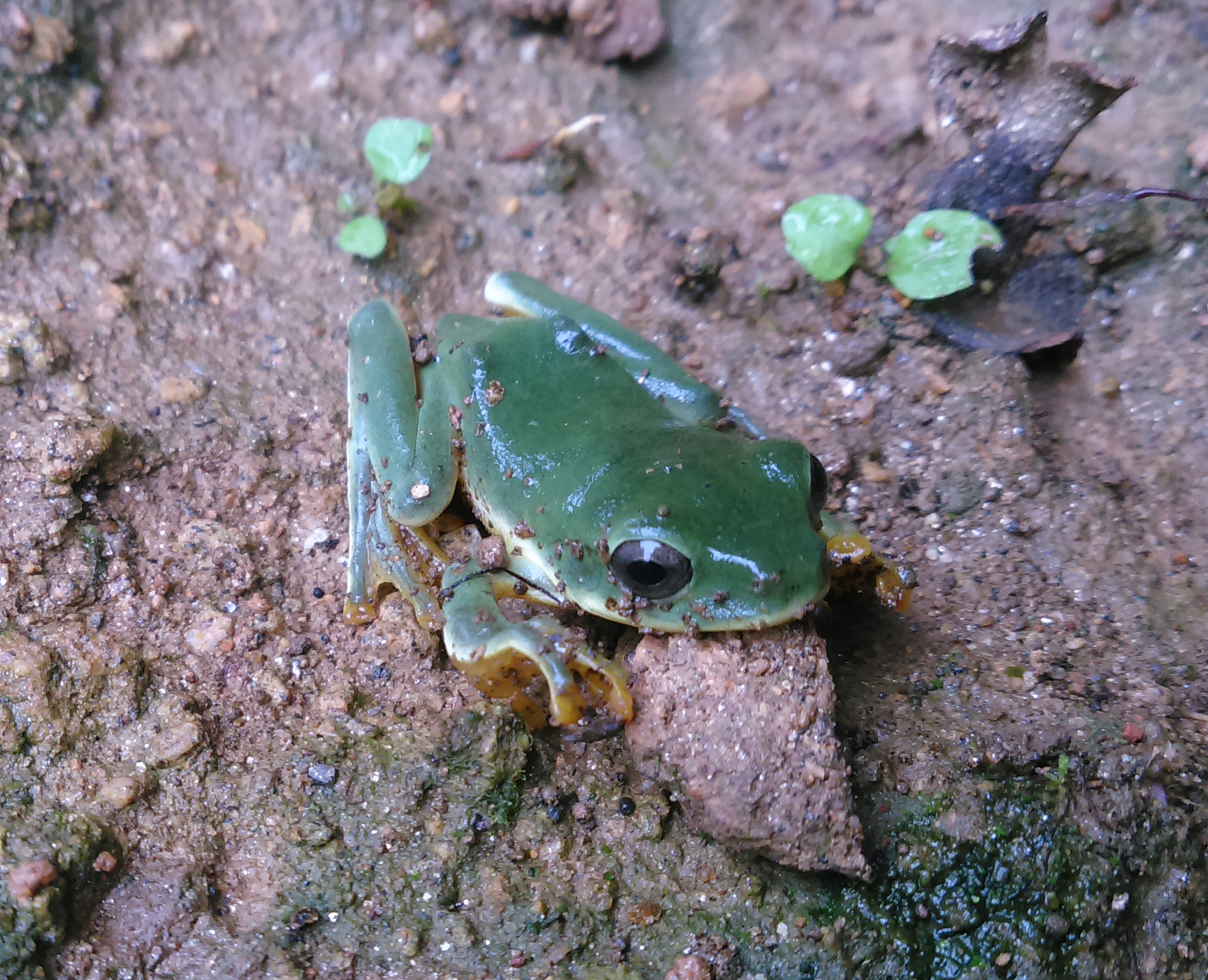

Conservation status
- Least Concern (IUCN 3.1)

Scientific classification
- Kingdom: Animalia
- Phylum: Chordata
- Class: Amphibia
- Order: Anura
- Family: Rhacophoridae
- Genus: Zhangixalus
- Species: Z. suffry

Binomial name
- Zhangixalus suffry (Bordoloi, Bortamuli and Ohler, 2007)

Synonyms
- Rhacophorus suffry Bordoloi, Bortamuli and Ohler, 2007

= Zhangixalus suffry =

Species of amphibian

Zhangixalus suffry is a species of flying frog first described to science in 2007. It is endemic to the eastern Himalayas and India.

This species lives in swampy habitats, but has also been observed in banana and nut plantations and other cultivated areas. The frog has been observed between 60 and 1889 meters above sea level.

Scientists believe this frog is arboreal and breeds through larval development.

Scientists believe this frog is not in danger of dying out because of its large range. This frog's range includes some protected parks: Nameri National Park, Dihingpatkai Wildlife Sanctuary, and Namdapha Tiger Reserve. Scientists believe deforestation and pollution may pose some threat.

== Etymology ==
The name of the genus honors Zhang Ya-Ping from the Chinese Academy of Sciences, in recognition to his contributions to biodiversity and evolution research in China, in combination with ixalus, a common generic root for treefrogs. The specific name is in reference to the Suffry Tea Estate near where the species was first recorded in Sivsagar, Assam, India.

== Original description ==
- Bordoli S; Bortamuli T; Ohler A (2007). "Systematics of the genus Rhacophorus (Amphibia, Anura): Identity of red-webbed forms and description of a new species from Assam". Zootaxa. 1653: 1–20.
