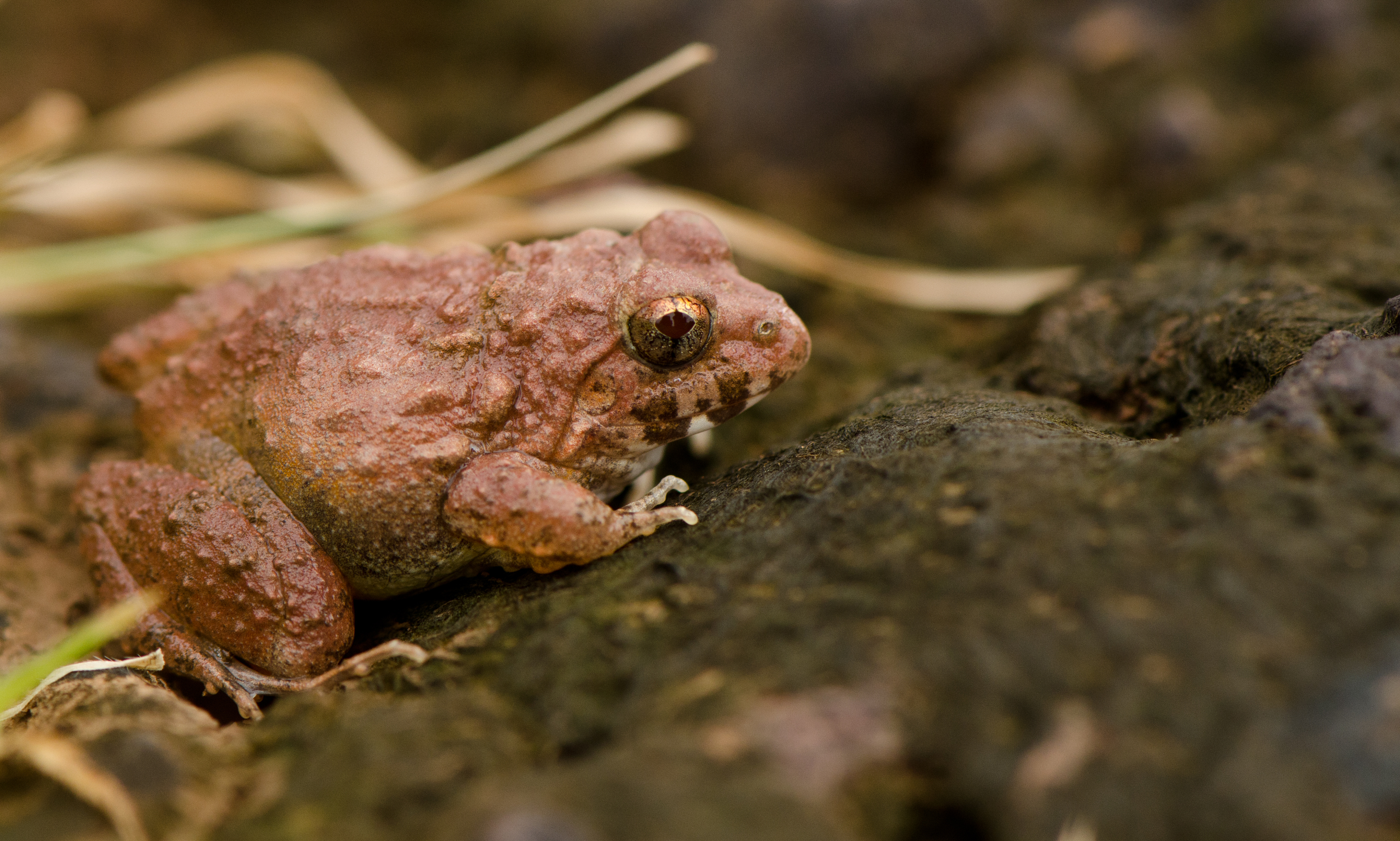
- Minervarya rufescens from Madayippara, Kerala

Conservation status
- Near Threatened (IUCN 3.1)

Scientific classification
- Kingdom: Animalia
- Phylum: Chordata
- Class: Amphibia
- Order: Anura
- Family: Dicroglossidae
- Genus: Minervarya
- Species: M. rufescens

Binomial name
- Minervarya rufescens (Jerdon, 1854)

Synonyms
- Pyxicephalus rufescens Jerdon, 1854; Fejervarya rufescens (Jerdon, 1854)

= Minervarya rufescens =

Species of amphibian

Minervarya rufescens (common names: Malabar wart frog, reddish burrowing frog, or rufescent burrowing frog) is a species of frog that is endemic to the Western Ghats, India. It occurs in Maharashtra, Karnataka, Goa, and Kerala states. It is a locally common species associated with riparian and forest edge habitats in open and lightly degraded tropical moist semi-evergreen forests.

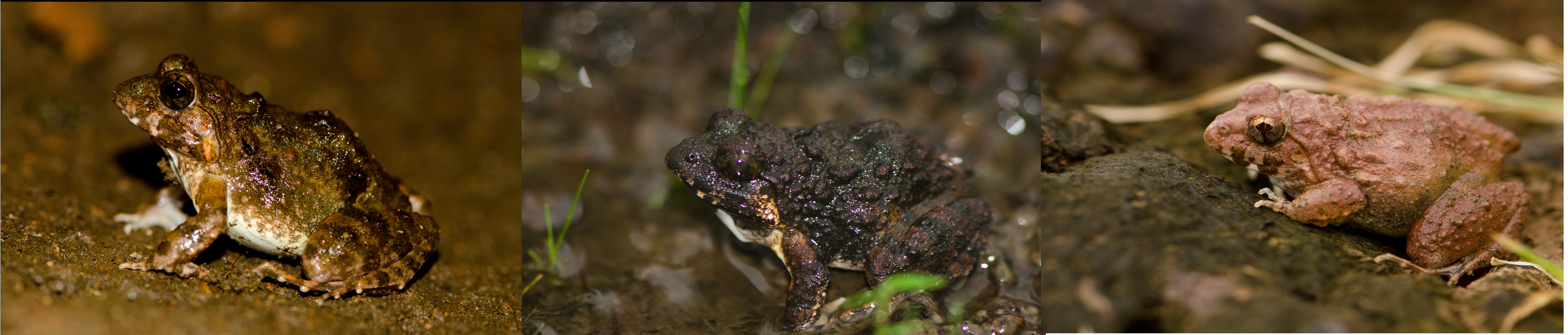
Color variations of Minervarya rufescens
