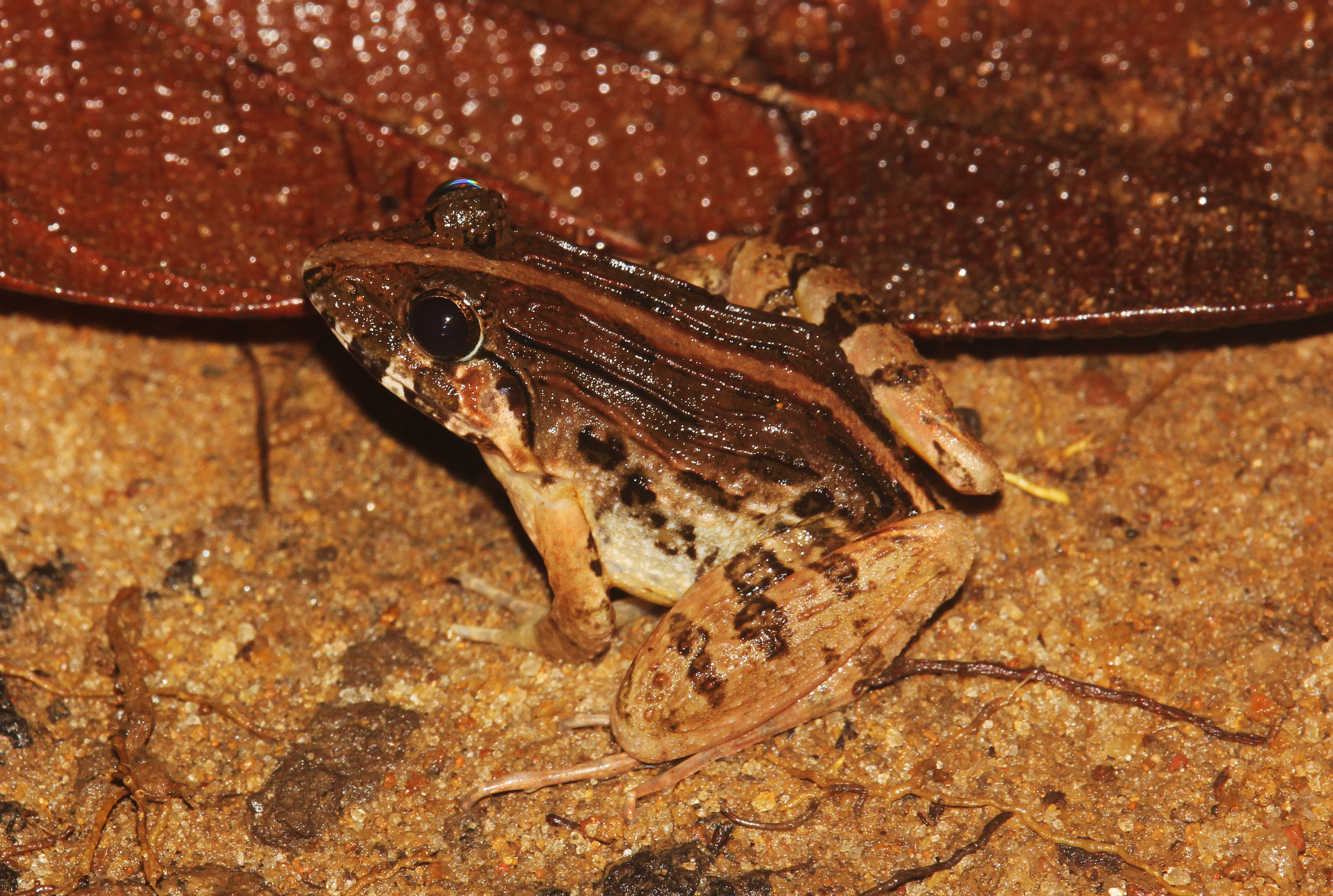

Conservation status
- Least Concern (IUCN 3.1)

Scientific classification
- Kingdom: Animalia
- Phylum: Chordata
- Class: Amphibia
- Order: Anura
- Family: Dicroglossidae
- Genus: Minervarya
- Species: M. kirtisinghei

Binomial name
- Minervarya kirtisinghei (Manamendra-Arachchi & Gabadage, 1996)
- Range of Z. kirtisinghei in Sri Lanka

Synonyms
- Limnonectes kirtisinghei Manamendra-Arachchi & Gabadage, 1996; Fejervarya kirtisinghei (Manamendra-Arachchi & Gabadage, 1996)

= Minervarya kirtisinghei =

Species of amphibian

Minervarya kirtisinghei (Kirtisinghe's frog) is a species of frog in the family Dicroglossidae. It is endemic to Sri Lanka where it is found in the montane south-central to lowland southwestern areas.

Minervarya kirtisinghei is a common frog. They occur in tropical forests, savanna, grasslands and wetlands, in both montane and lowland areas, as well as in some human-made habitats like rubber and palm oil plantations and home gardens. Adults are semi-aquatic whereas the larvae are aquatic.
