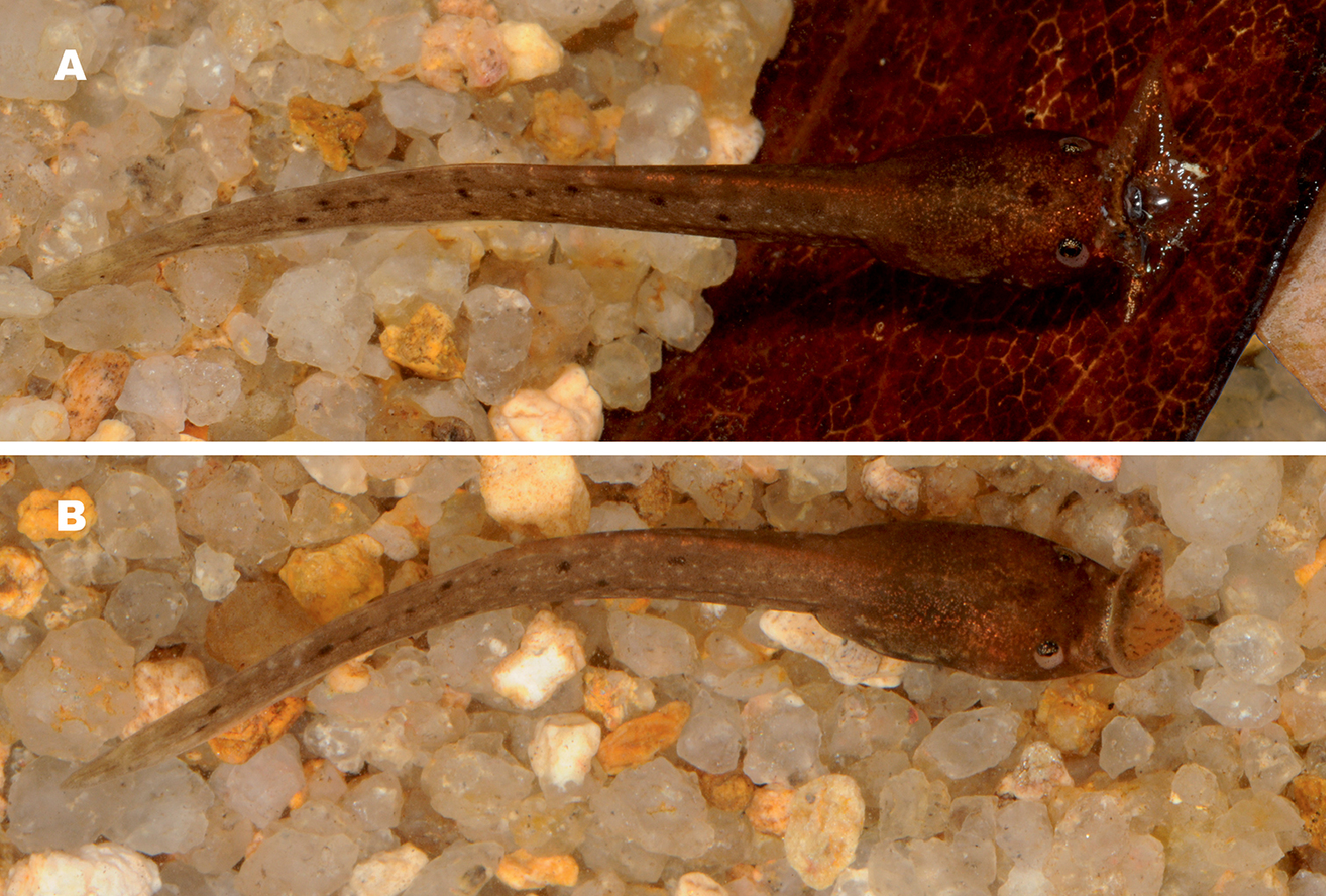

Scientific classification
- Kingdom: Animalia
- Phylum: Chordata
- Class: Amphibia
- Order: Anura
- Family: Megophryidae
- Genus: Ophryophryne; Boulenger, 1903

Type species
- Ophryophryne microstoma Boulenger, 1903

= Ophryophryne =

Genus of amphibians

Ophryophryne is a genus of amphibian in the family Megophryidae from Southeast Asia. They are sometimes known as mountain toads.

== Species ==
The genus contains the following seven species:

- Ophrophryne elfina Poyarkov, Duong, Orlov, Gogoleva, Vassilieva, Nguyen, Nguyen, Nguyen, Che, and Mahony, 2017
- Ophryophryne gerti Ohler, 2003
- Ophryophryne hansi Ohler, 2003
- Ophryophryne microstoma Boulenger, 1903
- Ophryophryne poilani
- Ophryophryne pachyproctus Kou, 1985
- Ophryophryne synoria Stuart, Sok, and Neang, 2006
