= Minervarya brevipalmata =

Conservation status
- Data Deficient (IUCN 3.1)

Scientific classification
- Kingdom: Animalia
- Phylum: Chordata
- Class: Amphibia
- Order: Anura
- Family: Dicroglossidae
- Genus: Minervarya
- Species: M. brevipalmata

Binomial name
- Minervarya brevipalmata (Peters, 1871)
- Range of M. brevipalmata

Synonyms
- Rana brevipalmata Peters, 1871; Limnonectes brevipalmatus (Peters, 1871); Fejervarya brevipalmata (Peters, 1871)

Species of amphibian

Minervarya brevipalmata, commonly known as short-webbed frog, Peters' frog, and Pegu wart frog, is a species of frog found in the Western Ghats of southern India (Maharashtra, Tamil Nadu, and Kerala states).

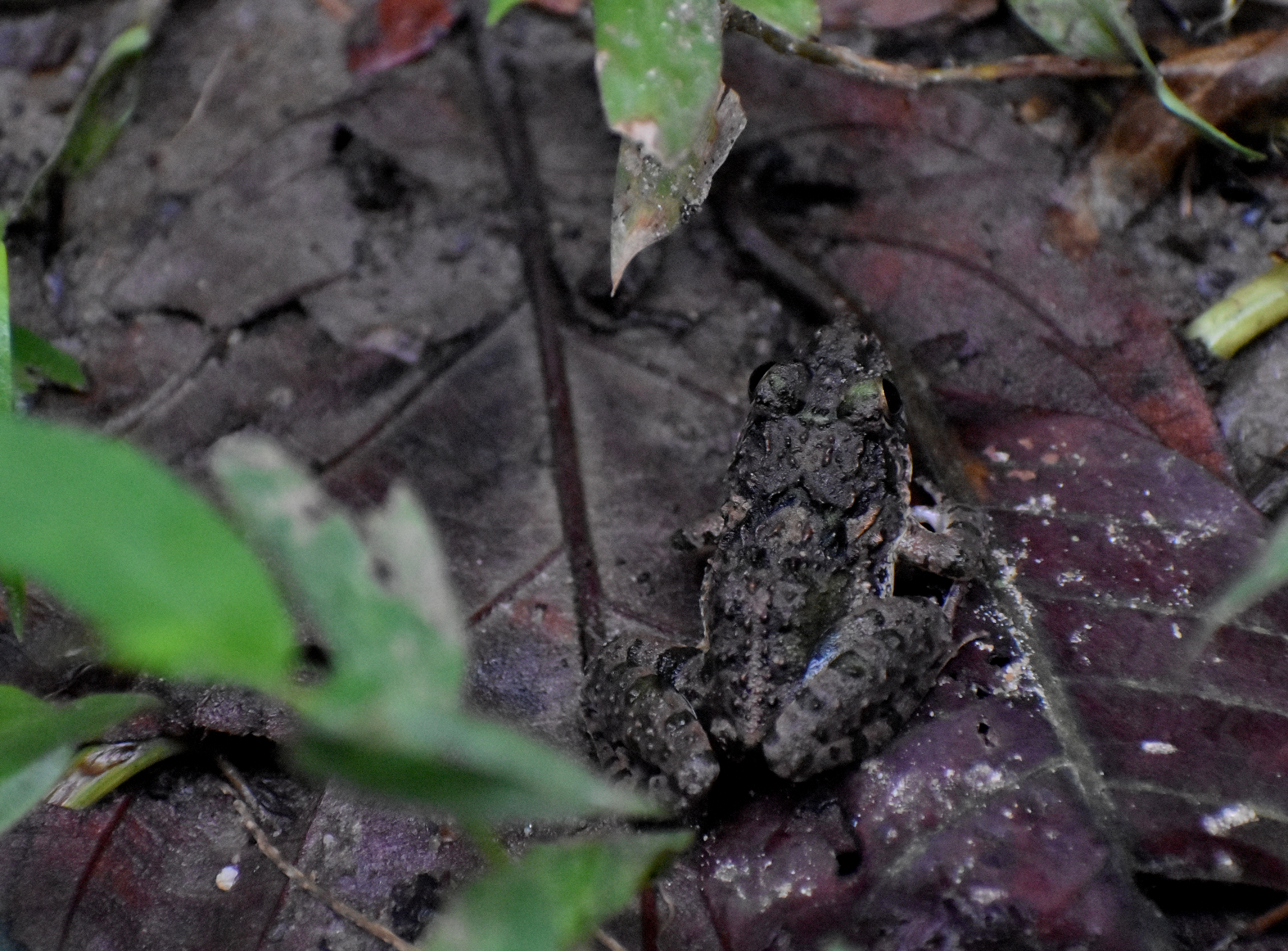
A Minervarya species spotted in Dehing Patkai National Park, Assam

M. brevipalmata is a little-known and uncommon grassland frog associated with waterlogged or marshy areas, but it has also been recorded from suitable wet patches of forest and lightly degraded former forest.
