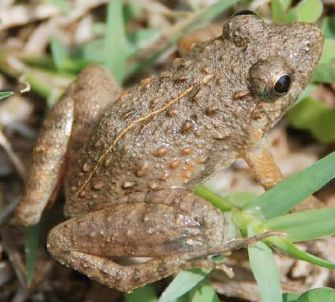
- Minervarya pierrei from Dagana District, Bhutan

Conservation status
- Least Concern (IUCN 3.1)

Scientific classification
- Kingdom: Animalia
- Phylum: Chordata
- Class: Amphibia
- Order: Anura
- Family: Dicroglossidae
- Genus: Minervarya
- Species: M. pierrei

Binomial name
- Minervarya pierrei (Dubois, 1975)

Synonyms
- Rana pierrei Dubois, 1975; Fejervarya pierrei (Dubois, 1975)

= Minervarya pierrei =

Species of amphibian

Minervarya pierrei (Pierre's wart frog, Pierre's cricket frog) is a species of frog in the family Dicroglossidae. It is found in Nepal, adjacent India, and eastern Bangladesh. It has recently been reported also from Bhutan. It is a common species associated with paddy fields.
