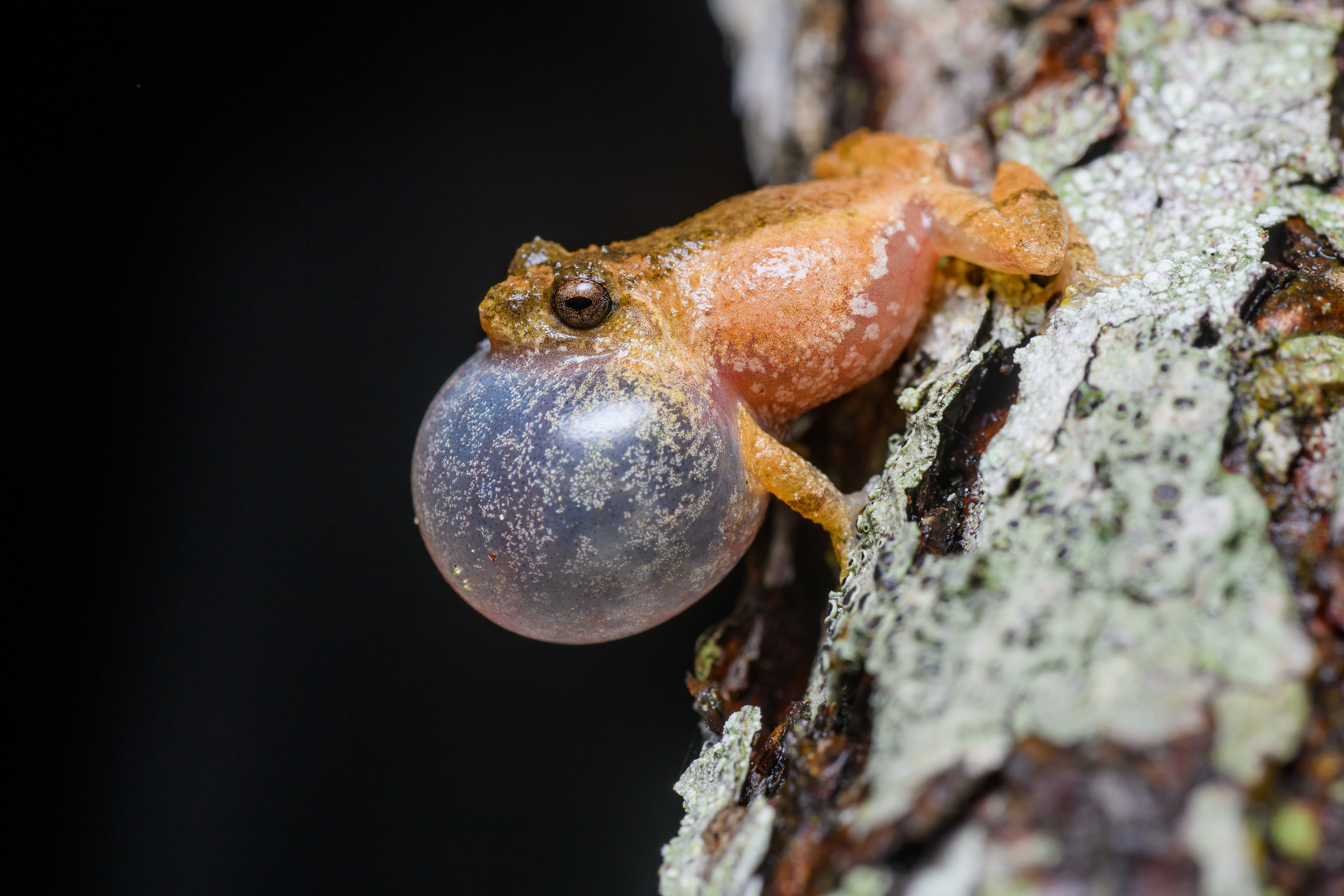
- Male, Phu Kradueng National Park, Thailand

Conservation status
- Least Concern (IUCN 3.1)

Scientific classification
- Kingdom: Animalia
- Phylum: Chordata
- Class: Amphibia
- Order: Anura
- Family: Rhacophoridae
- Genus: Raorchestes
- Species: R. parvulus

Binomial name
- Raorchestes parvulus (Boulenger, 1893)

Synonyms
- Ixalus parvulus Boulenger, 1893; Rhacophorus parvulus (Boulenger, 1893); Philautus parvulus (Boulenger, 1893); Rhacophorus parvulus (Boulenger, 1893)

= Raorchestes parvulus =

Species of amphibian

Raorchestes parvulus (common names: Karin bubble-nest frog, tiny bubble-nest frog, dwarf bushfrog, cricket frog) is a species of frog in the family Rhacophoridae. It is found from eastern Bangladesh east through Myanmar and Thailand to Cambodia, northern Vietnam, Laos, and Peninsular Malaysia. Its distribution might well extend into northeastern India and southern China. This species was first described by George Albert Boulenger based on seven specimens collected by Leonardo Fea from Karen Hills, Burma.

This may be a complex of more than one species.

== Description ==
This is a small frog species. Males measure up to 23 mm (0.91 in) in snout-vent length, although modern sources give range 18–21 mm (0.71–0.83 in) for SVL. They have a rounded snout and hidden tympanum. The fingers and toes short and bear adhesive discs; fingers are free from webbing but toes are slightly webbed at their base. The back is greyish or brown. A dark bar or triangular blotch between the eyes and curved dark band the sides may be present. The hind limbs have some crossbars. Males have a large vocal sac.

== Habitat ==
Raorchestes parvulus is typically found in evergreen forest, but it can also be found in grassland with heath forest. Individuals are mostly found in trees and dense vegetation, both away from water and near streams. The altitudinal range is 46–1,500 m (151–4,921 ft) above sea level. Males call from the vegetation. The development is believed to be direct.

This species is probably suffering from habitat loss caused by logging and expanding agriculture and settlements. However, it is not considered threatened overall because of its wide distribution and presumed large total population. It is also documented from several protected areas and is likely present in many more.

== Photos ==
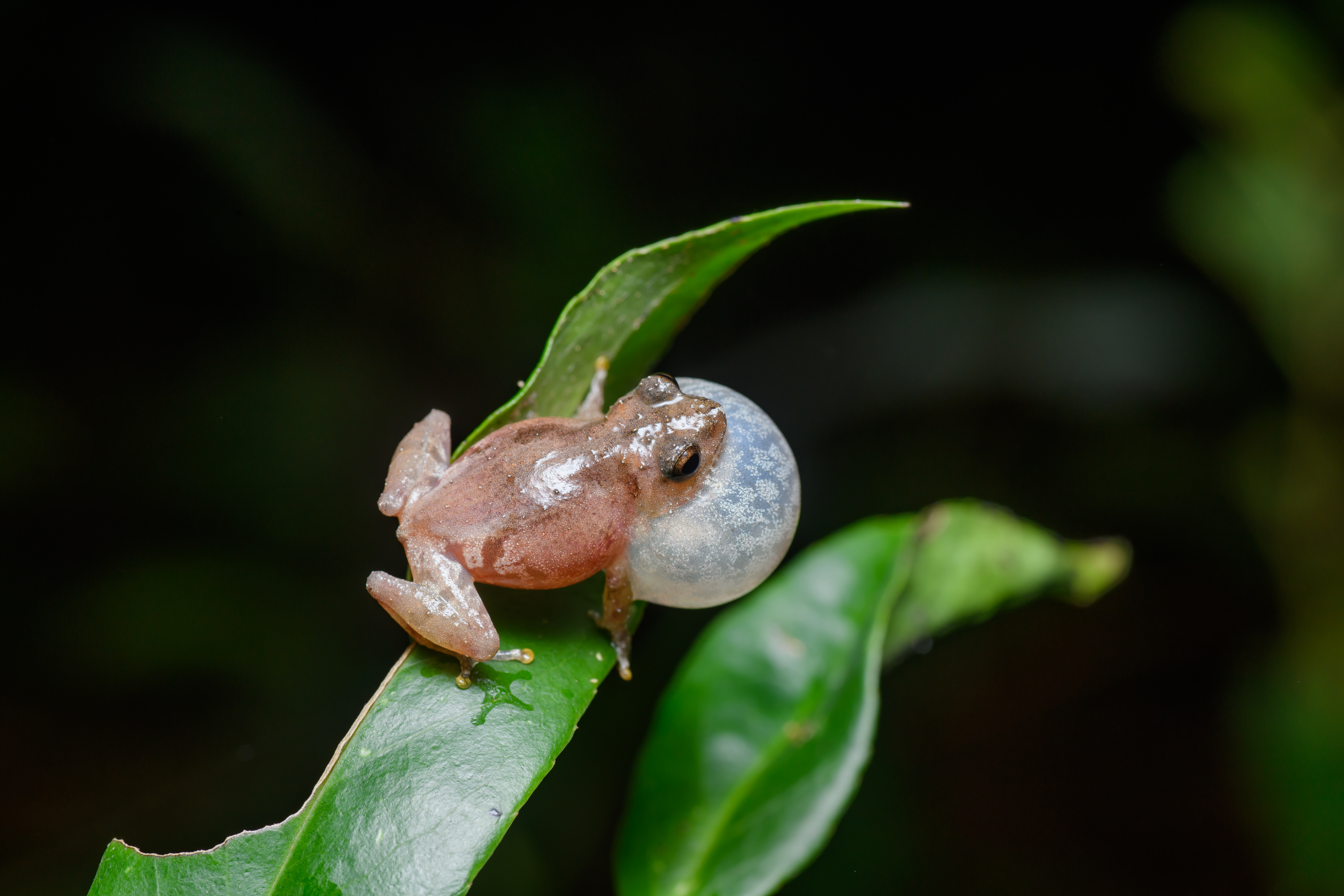
Male Raorchestes parvulus, dwarf bushfrog - Phu Kradueng National Park

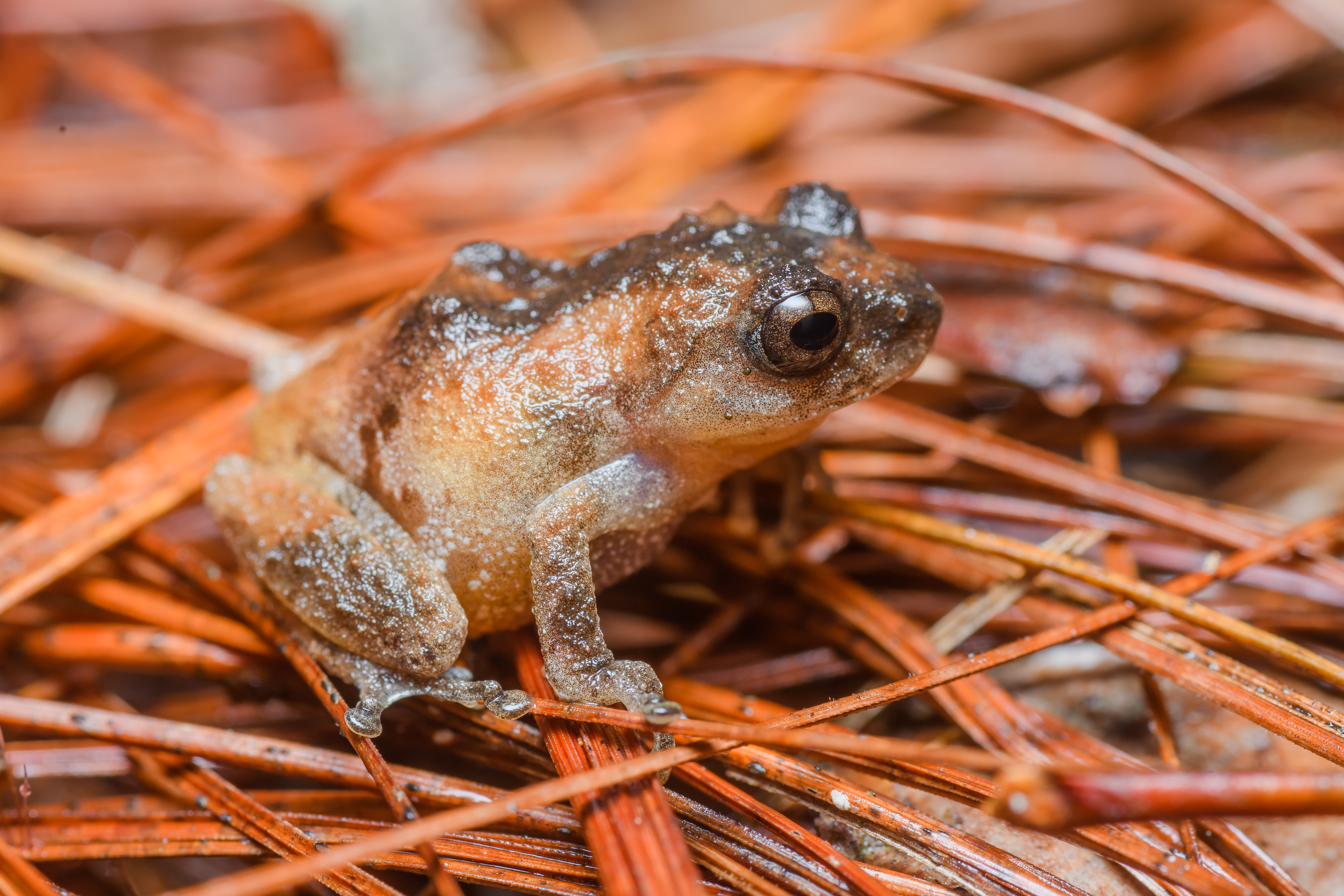
Female R. parvulus - Phu Kradueng National Park

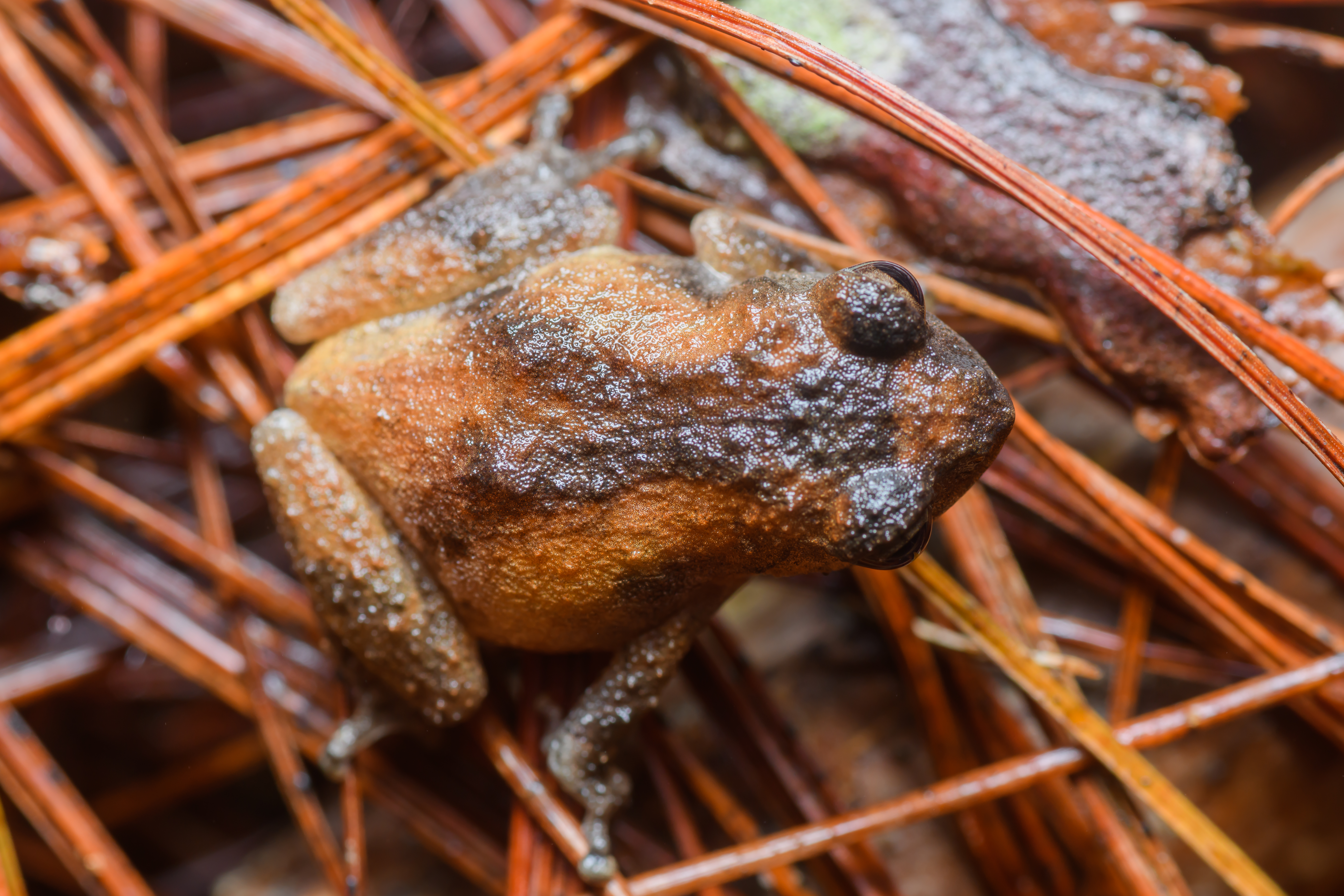
Female R. parvulus - Phu Kradueng National Park

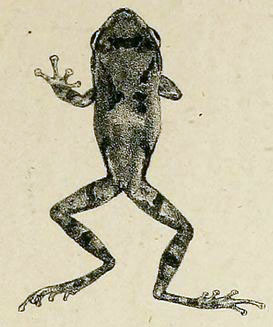
