= Gundia River =

River in India

Gundia River is a second order tributary of the Netravathi river in the state of Karnataka in southern India. A proposal by the Government of Karnataka to build a hydroelectric project across the river and its tributary streams has generated controversy and opposition from environmentalists.

== River Basin ==
The Gundia river is a tributary of the Kumaradhara river which in turn flows into the Netravathi. The Gundia's headstreams include the Yettinahole, Kerihole, Hongadahalla and Bettakumbri streams and the river basin straddles the districts of Dakshina Kannada and Hassan.

== Biodiversity ==
The Gundia river basin is part of the Western Ghats and is extremely rich in biodiversity. There are 239 plant species in the area including 119 tree species across several vegetation types including tropical evergreen and semi-evergreen forests, moist deciduous forests, scrub jungles, grasslands and riparian vegetation. The Kaginahara and Kempahole Reserve Forests lie in the Gundia basin.

The Kempahole region is classified as one of the Important Bird Areas of India according to the Bombay Natural History Society and the International Bird Conservation Network. Some of the rare and endemic species found in the Gundia basin include the Travancore flying squirrel, the Malabar pied hornbill, lion-tailed macaque, slender loris and the critically endangered frog species Indirana gundia which has been named after the former Prime Minister Indira Gandhi and Gundia, the only place where it is found. The basin has tigers and is also part of an elephant corridor that links the Bisle reserve forest with the Mysore Elephant Reserve.

== Gundia hydropower project ==
Gundia hydropower project is to be built by the Karnataka Power Corporation and aims to generate 400 MW of hydropower in two phases. Besides the generation of electricity, the project also envisages the diversion of waters to the Tumkur, Kolar, Chikballapur and Bangalore Rural districts for irrigation. The proposal however has run into opposition from local farmers and environmentalists with the Western Ghats Ecology Expert Panel headed by Madhav Gadgil recommending that the project be scrapped.
