= Annemarie Ohler =

Austrian herpetologist

- Born: 1960 (age 65–66); Vorchdorf, Oberosterreich, Austria
- Citizenship: Austria
- Education: Universität Wien, Université Paris-Diderot
- Occupation: herpetologist
- Employer: Muséum National d'Histoire Naturelle

Annemarie Ohler is an Austrian herpetologist and professor who concentrates on the taxonomy of amphibians. She has 3,602 citations and an h-index of 36.

== Life and work ==
After graduating from the federal higher boarding school in Traunsee Castle, Upper Austria, Ohler studied zoology, botany and biochemistry at the University of Vienna, where she wrote a dissertation in 1987 on the larval development of the pond frog (Pelophylax kl. esculentus), a hybridogenetic hybrid from the complex of forms of water frogs (Pelophylax) and received her Ph.D. During her studies she had a one-year research stay at the Pierre and Marie Curie University in Paris, where she studied experimental embryology. In 1988 she obtained the Diplôme d'études approfondies (DEA) from the University of Paris VII. Since 2008 she has been a professor at the Laboratory of Reptiles and Amphibians at the National Museum of Natural History, France.

Ohler is a specialist in the families of the Asian toad frog (Megophryidae) and the true frog (Ranidae), especially for species from tropical Asia and Africa. She works internationally with scientists from Southeast Asia and works with international organizations to protect amphibian species. Ohler has published more than a hundred specialist articles.

In 2015 she published the children's book La vie des grenouilles (The life of frogs) together with Alain Dubois and in 2017, also with Dubois, the work Évolution, extinction: le message des grenouilles (Evolution, extinction: the message from the frogs).

== Selected taxa described by Ohler ==
- Allopaa Ohler & Dubois, 2006
- Aubria masako Ohler & Kazadi, 1990
- Chrysopaa Ohler & Dubois, 2006
- Cyrtodactylus buchardi David, Teynié & Ohler, 2004
- Fejervarya iskandari M. Veith, Kosuch, Ohler & Dubois, 2001
- Fejervarya sahyadris (Dubois, Ohler & Biju, 2001)
- Gracixalus Delorme, Dubois, Grosjean & Ohler, 2005
- Hylarana faber (Ohler, S. Swan & Daltry, 2002)
- Lankanectes Dubois & Ohler, 2001
- Leptobrachium buchardi Ohler, Teynié & David, 2004
- Leptodactylodon blanci Ohler, 1999
- Leptolalax pluvialis Ohler, Marquis, S. Swan & Grosjean, 2000
- Micrixalidae Dubois, Ohler & Biju, 2001
- Nanorana rarica (Dubois, Matsui & Ohler, 2001)
- Ophryophryne gerti Ohler, 2003
- Ophryophryne hansi Ohler, 2003
- Philautus cardamonus Ohler, Swan & Daltry, 2002
- Ptychadena pujoli Lamotte & Ohler, 1997
- Rhacophorus duboisi Ohler, Marquis, Swan & Grosjean, 2000
- Rhacophorus kio Ohler & Delorme, 2006
- Rhacophorus laoshan Mo, Jiang, Xie & Ohler, 2008
- Rhacophorus suffry Bordoloi, Bortamuli & Ohler, 2007
- Xenophrys auralensis (Ohler, Swan & Daltry, 2002)
