= Minervarya asmati =

Bangladeshi cricket frog

Scientific classification
- Domain: Eukaryota
- Kingdom: Animalia
- Phylum: Chordata
- Class: Amphibia
- Order: Anura
- Family: Dicroglossidae
- Genus: Minervarya
- Species: M. asmati

Binomial name
- Minervarya asmati (Howlader, 2011)

Synonyms
- Fejervarya asmati Howlader, 2011

Species of amphibian

Minervarya asmati (Bangladeshi cricket frog) is a species of frogs found in the Chittagong and Dhaka, Bangladesh. Its type locality is on the University of Chittagong campus. It was described by Mohammad Sajid Ali Howlader in 2011.

== Description ==
The species is characterized by a male snout–vent length (SVL) of 29.1–30.0 mm (1.15–1.18 in) and female SVL of 33.4 mm (1.31 in). Its basic colour varies from olive green to greenish brown. Males have a butterfly shaped vocal marking.

== Behaviour ==
The species breeds in temporary pools. Male Minervarya asmati call for females; females prefer choruses rather than single or few calling males.
