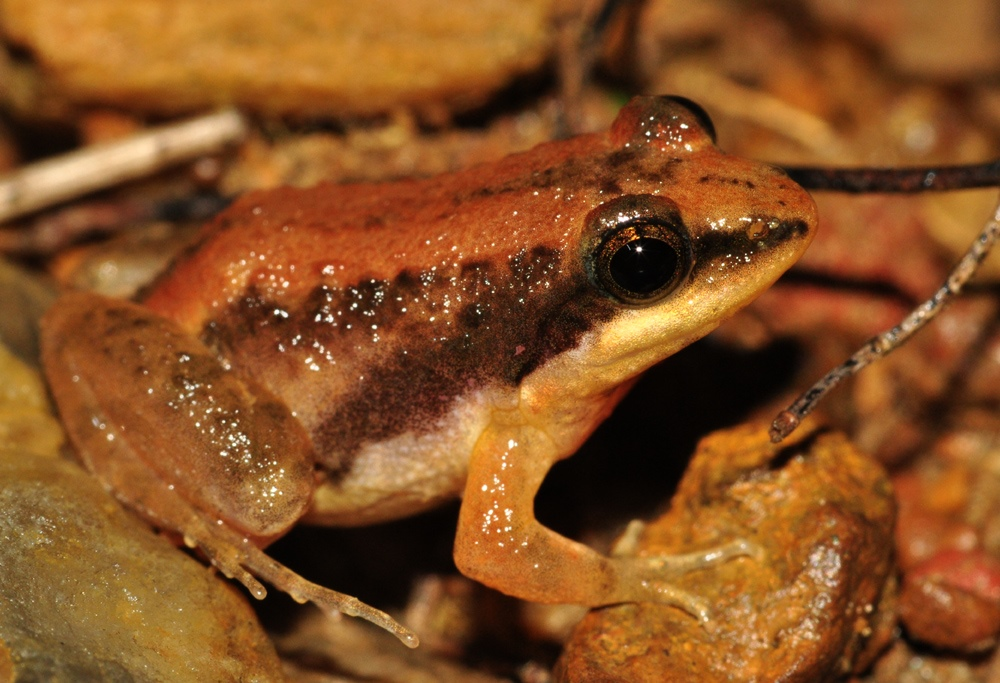
- Minervarya sahyadris

Scientific classification
- Kingdom: Animalia
- Phylum: Chordata
- Class: Amphibia
- Order: Anura
- Family: Dicroglossidae
- Subfamily: Dicroglossinae
- Genus: Minervarya; Dubois, Ohler, and Biju, 2001

Type species
- Minervarya sahyadris Dubois, Ohler, and Biju, 2001

Species
- See text.

Synonyms
- Zakerana Howlader, 2011

= Minervarya =

Genus of amphibians

Minervarya is a genus of frogs in the family Dicroglossidae from south Asia (Sri Lanka, the Indian subcontinent including Pakistan, Nepal, and Bangladesh), and Nepal and Bhutan. They are also known as cricket frogs or rice frogs.

== Taxonomy ==
The genus Minervarya was erected to resolve the paraphyly of the genus Fejervarya which until 2022, encompassed the species now found in Minervarya. This split was originally proposed in 2018 using the name Zakerana, which is now recognised as a junior synonym to the name Minervarya.

=== Species ===
The following species are recognised in the genus Minervarya:

- Minervarya agricola (Jerdon, 1853)
- Minervarya andamanensis (Stoliczka, 1870)
- Minervarya asmati (Howlader, 2011)
- Minervarya brevipalmata (Peters, 1871)
- Minervarya cepfi (Garg and Biju, 2017)
- Minervarya charlesdarwini (Das, 1998)
- Minervarya chiangmaiensis (Suwannapoom, Yuan, Poyarkov, Yan, Kamtaeja, Murphy, and Che, 2016)
- Minervarya chilapata Ohler, Deuti, Grosjean, Paul, Ayyaswamy, Ahmed, and Dutta, 2009
- Minervarya goemchi (Dinesh, Kulkarni, Swamy, and Deepak, 2018 "2017")
- Minervarya gomantaki (Dinesh, Vijayakumar, Channakeshavamurthy, Torsekar, Kulkarni, and Shanker, 2015)
- Minervarya greenii (Boulenger, 1905)
- Minervarya kadar (Garg and Biju, 2017)
- Minervarya kalinga (Raj, Dinesh, Das, Dutta, Kar, and Mohapatra, 2018)
- Minervarya keralensis (Dubois, 1981)
- Minervarya kirtisinghei (Manamendra-Arachchi and Gabadage, 1996)
- Minervarya krishnan (Raj, Dinesh, Das, Dutta, Kar, and Mohapatra, 2018)
- Minervarya manoharani (Garg and Biju, 2017)
- Minervarya marathi (Phuge, Dinesh, Andhale, Bhakare, and Pandit, 2019)
- Minervarya muangkanensis (Suwannapoom, Yuan, Jiang, Yan, Gao, and Che, 2017)
- Minervarya mysorensis (Rao, 1922)
- Minervarya neilcoxi (Garg and Biju, 2017)
- Minervarya nepalensis (Dubois, 1975)
- Minervarya nicobariensis (Stoliczka, 1870)
- Minervarya nilagirica (Jerdon, 1853)
- Minervarya pentali Garg and Biju, 2021
- Minervarya pierrei (Dubois, 1975)
- Minervarya rufescens (Jerdon, 1853)
- Minervarya sahyadris Dubois, Ohler, and Biju, 2001
- Minervarya sengupti (Purkayastha and Matsui, 2012)
- Minervarya syhadrensis (Annandale, 1919)
- Minervarya teraiensis (Dubois, 1984)
