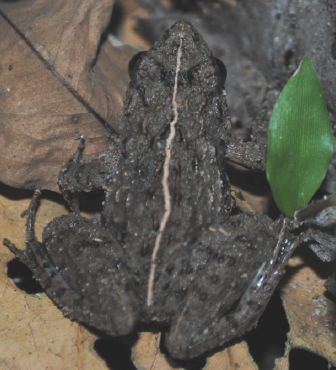
- Zakerana nepalensis from Samdrup Jongkhar District, Bhutan

Conservation status
- Least Concern (IUCN 3.1)

Scientific classification
- Kingdom: Animalia
- Phylum: Chordata
- Class: Amphibia
- Order: Anura
- Family: Dicroglossidae
- Genus: Minervarya
- Species: M. nepalensis

Binomial name
- Minervarya nepalensis (Dubois, 1975)

Synonyms
- Rana nepalensis Dubois, 1975; Fejervarya nepalensis (Dubois, 1975); Zakerana nepalensis

= Minervarya nepalensis =

Species of amphibian

Minervarya nepalensis (Nepal cricket frog or Nepal warty frog) is a small-sized frog native to northern and northeastern India, Bangladesh, and Nepal. It has recently been reported also from Bhutan. Having distinct and narrow middorsal line (MDL); indistinct skin fringe on outer side of 5th toe; relative finger length (RFL) is 2<1<4<3, 1st finger scarcely longer than 2nd; laterally dark and medially pale throat in males; body tubercles oblong, arranged in longitudinal folds; and snout jutting over jaw.
