= Minervarya andamanensis =

Andaman Frog

Conservation status
- Least Concern (IUCN 3.1)

Scientific classification
- Kingdom: Animalia
- Phylum: Chordata
- Class: Amphibia
- Order: Anura
- Family: Dicroglossidae
- Genus: Minervarya
- Species: M. andamanensis

Binomial name
- Minervarya andamanensis (Stoliczka, 1870)

Synonyms
- Rana gracilis var. andamanensis Stoliczka, 1870; Rana limnocharis andamanensis Annandale, 1917; Rana (Fejervarya) andamanensis Dubois, 1984; Euphlyctis limnocharis andamanensis Poynton and Broadley, 1985; Limnonectes (Fejervarya) andamanensis Dubois, 1987; Fejervarya andamanensis (Stoliczka, 1870)

Species of amphibian

Minervarya andamanensis, commonly known as the Andaman frog, chestnut-brown frog, or Andaman wart frog is a species of frog in the family Dicroglossidae. It is endemic to the Andaman Islands of India.

== Taxonomy ==
It has been regarded as a synonym of Limnonectes limnocharis, but is now considered a valid species. A related, unnamed species exists in western Thailand.

== Habitat ==
This frog lives in grassy places, mangrove forests, and in primary and secondary forest. It has also been found in disturbed habitats such as rice paddies. Scientists saw this frog as high as 400 meters above sea level.

Scientists have found this frog in two protected parks: Mount Harriet National Park, which is on South Andaman Island, and Rani Jhansi Marine National Park, which is in Ritchie's Archipelago.

== Reproduction ==
This frog lays eggs after monsoon rains. They lay eggs in pools of water that dry up later.

== Threats ==
The IUCN classifies this frog as least concern of extinction. It is sometimes found as roadkill. Scientists have detected the fungus Batrachochytrium dendrobatidis on the Andaman Islands and Nicobar Islands, so they believe the fungal chytridiomycosis could pose a threat to this frog.
