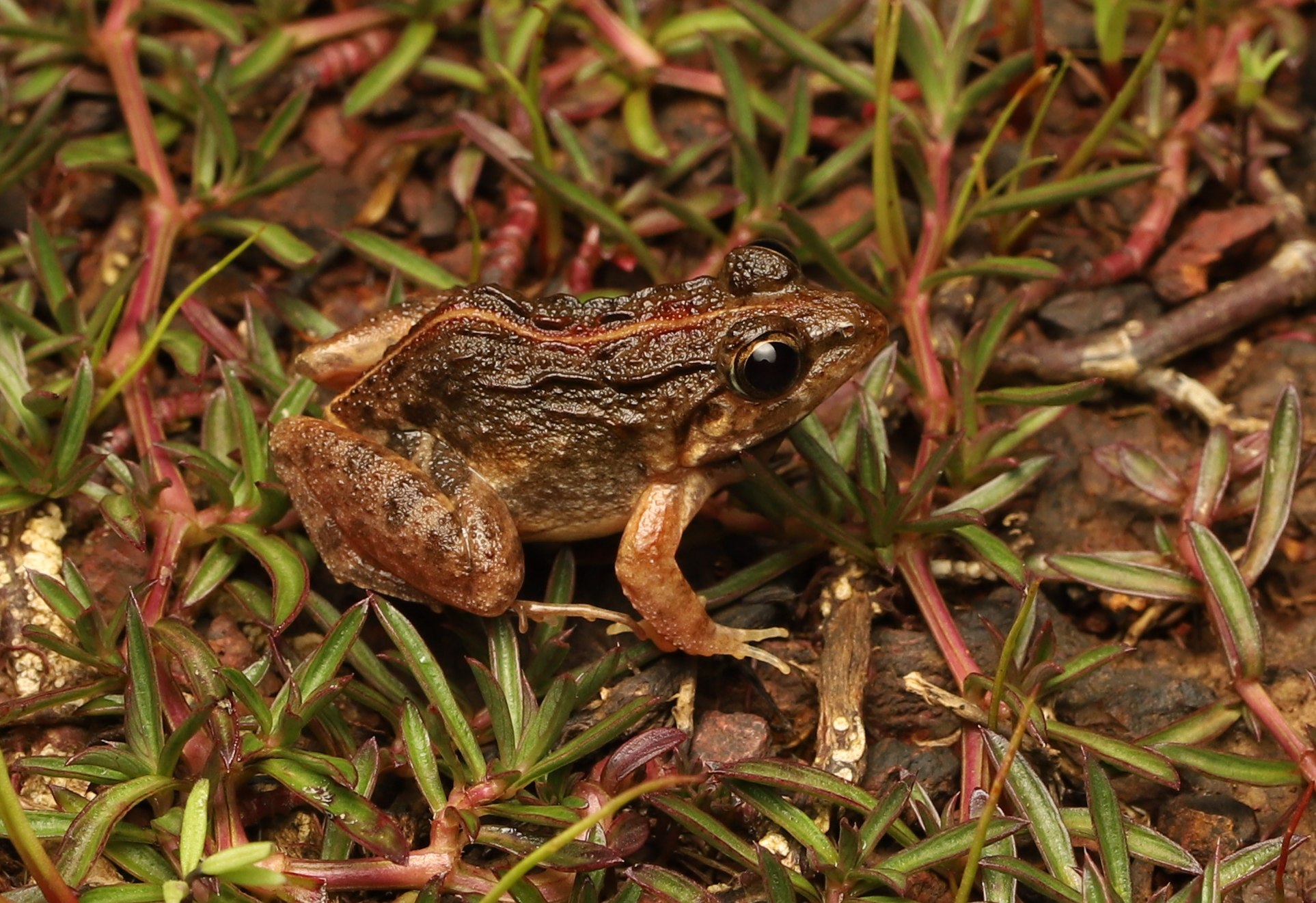

Conservation status
- Least Concern (IUCN 3.1)

Scientific classification
- Kingdom: Animalia
- Phylum: Chordata
- Class: Amphibia
- Order: Anura
- Family: Dicroglossidae
- Genus: Minervarya
- Species: M. syhadrensis

Binomial name
- Minervarya syhadrensis (Annandale, 1919)

Synonyms
- List: Rana limnocharis syhadrensis Annandale, 1919; Nyctibatrachus sanctipalustris var. modestus Rao, 1920; Limnonectes syhadrensis (Annandale, 1919); Fejervarya caperata Kuramoto, Joshy, Kurabayashi, and Sumida, 2008 "2007"; Fejervarya modesta Rao, 1920; Fejervarya syhadrensis (Annandale, 1919); Minervarya modesta (Rao, 1920); Zakerana syhadrensis (Annandale, 1919)

= Minervarya syhadrensis =

Long-legged cricket frog

Species of amphibian

Minervarya syhadrensis, commonly known as long-legged cricket frog, Syhadra frog, Bombay wart frog, and many others, is a species of frog in the family Dicroglossidae found in India, Bangladesh, and Nepal at low to moderate elevations. It is the type species of genus Minervarya. In view of its wide distribution and stable population trend, IUCN assessors listed it as Least Concern in 2009 and 2016.

== Description ==
The long-legged cricket frog is a small-sized frog. Females reach a snout–vent length (SVL) of 20.7–22.8 mm. Males are smaller with a SVL of 17.5–19.1 mm.

== Distribution and habitat ==
Long-legged cricket frogs are widely distributed over much of central northern India and western Peninsular India, Bangladesh, southern Nepal, from lower Punjab to Sindh in Pakistan, and found at elevations below 2,000 metres (6,600 ft). In Nepal's Shivapuri Nagarjun National Park, 13 specimen were observed in the summer of 2009 within a distance of 50 metres (160 ft) from water bodies.

== Behaviour and ecology ==
During the breeding season, males emit advertisement calls, using a single subgular external vocal sac. They start calling after one or two heavy pre-monsoon or monsoon rains in April to June, and continue up to the end of the rainy season in September to October. They call mainly during the night beginning after dusk and continue until the early morning of the following day, preferably sitting in temporary shallow water pools under partly submerged grass or paddy. They call in chorus but maintain a distance of 0.5 to 1 m to each other. Their calls are antiphonal between the two nearest calling males and consist of a series of pulse groups varying per call between 7 and 28.
