= Pygmy frog =

Pygmy frog may refer to:

- Beautiful pygmy frog (Microhyla pulchra), a frog in the family Microhylidae found in northeastern India, southern China, and Southeast Asia south to at least Thailand but possibly as far south as Malaysia and Singapore
- Dalat pygmy frog (Microhyla fusca), a frog in the family Microhylidae endemic to Vietnam
- Large pygmy frog (Microhyla berdmorei)), a frog in the family Microhylidae found in eastern India, Bangladesh, southernmost China (Yunnan), Mainland Southeast Asia as well as Borneo and Sumatra
- Marbled pygmy frog (Microhyla pulchra), a frog in the family Microhylidae found in northeastern India, southern China, and Southeast Asia south to at least Thailand but possibly as far south as Malaysia and Singapore
- Ornamented pygmy frog (Microhyla ornata), a frog in the family Microhylidae found in Kashmir, Nepal, peninsular India and the Andaman and Nicobar Islands, Sri Lanka, and Bangladesh
- Pygmy crawl frog (Leptolalax oshanensis), a frog in the family Megophryidae endemic to southern–central China (Guizhou, Hubei, and Sichuan provinces)
- Pygmy forest frog (Platymantis pygmaeus), a frog in the family Ceratobatrachidae endemic to the Philippines
- Pygmy wrinkled frog (Nyctibatrachus beddomii), a frog in the family Nyctibatrachidae endemic to the Western Ghats of India
- Round-snout pygmy frog (Pseudophilautus femoralis), a frog in the family Rhacophoridae endemic to Sri Lanka
- Taiwan little pygmy frog (Micryletta steinegeri), a frog in the family Microhylidae endemic to Taiwan
- Tubercled pygmy frog or Butler's pigmy frog (Microhyla butleri), a frog in the family Microhylidae found in India, Myanmar, China, Hong Kong, Taiwan, Thailand, Cambodia, Laos, Vietnam, Peninsular Malaysia, and Singapore

== See also ==
- Pygmy tree frog (disambiguation)
