= Chorus frog (disambiguation) =

The chorus frog (Pseudacris) is a genus of frogs in the family Hylidae found in North America ranging from the Pacific coastline to the Atlantic.

Chorus frog may also refer to:

- Annam chorus frog (Microhyla annamensis)), a frog in the family Microhylidae found in Cambodia, Laos, Thailand, and Vietnam
- Berdmore's chorus frog (Microhyla berdmorei), a frog in the family Microhylidae found in eastern India, Bangladesh, southernmost China (Yunnan), Mainland Southeast Asia as well as Borneo and Sumatra
- Bornean chorus frog (Microhyla borneensis), a frog in the family Microhylidae found in the Matang Range in Sarawak, Borneo
- Javan chorus frog (Microhyla achatina), a frog in the family Microhylidae found in Java
- Ornate chorus frog (Asia) (Microhyla fissipes), a frog in the family Microhylidae found in East and Southeast Asia, from southern and central China and Taiwan to the Malay Peninsula
- Painted chorus frog (Microhyla butleri), a frog in the family Microhylidae found in India, Myanmar, China, Taiwan, Thailand, Cambodia, Laos, Vietnam, Malaysia, and Singapore
- Palmated chorus frog (Microhyla palmipes), a frog in the family Microhylidae found in Indonesia and Malaysia

== See also ==
- Frog Chorus, a song by Paul McCartney and the chorus that sings it
