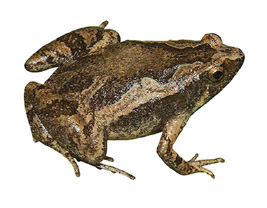
- Male Microhyla chakrapanii

Conservation status
- Data Deficient (IUCN 3.1)

Scientific classification
- Kingdom: Animalia
- Phylum: Chordata
- Class: Amphibia
- Order: Anura
- Family: Microhylidae
- Genus: Microhyla
- Species: M. chakrapanii

Binomial name
- Microhyla chakrapanii Pillai, 1977

= Microhyla chakrapanii =

Species of frog

Microhyla chakrapanii is a species of frog in the family Microhylidae, the narrow-mouthed frogs. It is endemic to the Andaman Islands. It is also known as the Mayabunder rice frog, Chakrapani's narrow-mouthed frog, and bilateral banded frog. Although morphology suggests association with the Microhyla achatina group, molecular data places it in the Microhyla fissipes group, with Microhyla mymensinghensis as its closest relative.

== Description ==
Adult males measure 17–22 mm (0.7–0.9 in) in snout–vent length. The body is moderately stout. The snout is rounded. The tympanum is not visible. The finger tips have no discs whereas the toes do bear distinct discs; the toes have basal webbing. Skin is smooth dorsally, where the throat, chest, and part of belly are rough. The dorsum is brownish grey. There are two dark patches on both sides of the mid-dorsal line at the shoulder level, and another pair of broad, bracket-shaped patches behind them. Lateral bands run on both sides extending from the tip of the snout almost to the groin.

== Distribution ==
Microhyla chakrapanii is known from the North Andaman, Middle Andaman, South Andaman, Rutland, Little Andaman, Long Island, and Neill Island.

== Habitat and conservation ==
Microhyla chakrapanii is fossorial. Most specimens have been found under grasses on the edges of temporary pools and puddles, often in secondary forests during the breeding season, typically in November. It has also been reported from paddy fields and primary evergreen forests.

This species is listed as "data deficient" in the IUCN Red List of Threatened Species, in an assessment made in 2004, at the time when it was only known from Mayabunder in North Andaman.
