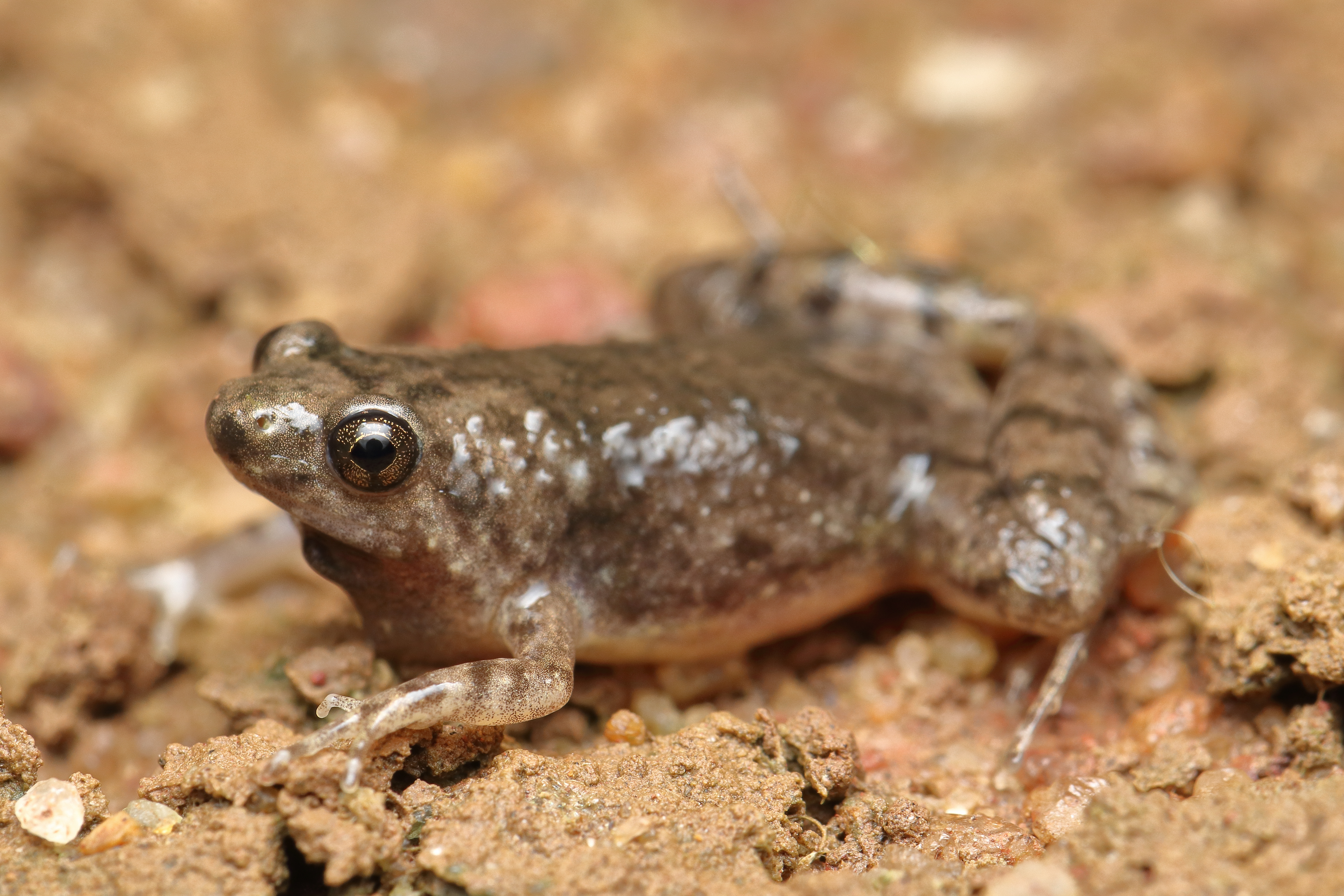

Scientific classification
- Kingdom: Animalia
- Phylum: Chordata
- Class: Amphibia
- Order: Anura
- Family: Microhylidae
- Genus: Microhyla
- Species: M. kodial

Binomial name
- Microhyla kodial Vineeth et al., 2018

Audio
- Calls

= Microhyla kodial =

Species of amphibian

Microhyla kodial, the Mangaluru narrow-mouthed frog, is a frog species belongs to family Microhylidae. It is likely endemic to a small portion of India, and was discovered in the urban part of Mangalore. This new discovery was published at international journal Zootaxa on Tuesday May 16, 2018.

== Description ==
Microhyla kodial is a very small species with a snout to vent length of about 16.9-17.4mm in male and 18.0 to 20.4mm in female. Its snout is rounded in ventral and dorsal view, the canthus rostralis is indistinct and the snout protrudes beyond mouth in ventral view. Vertebral stripes are absent along with the absence of superciliary tubercles.

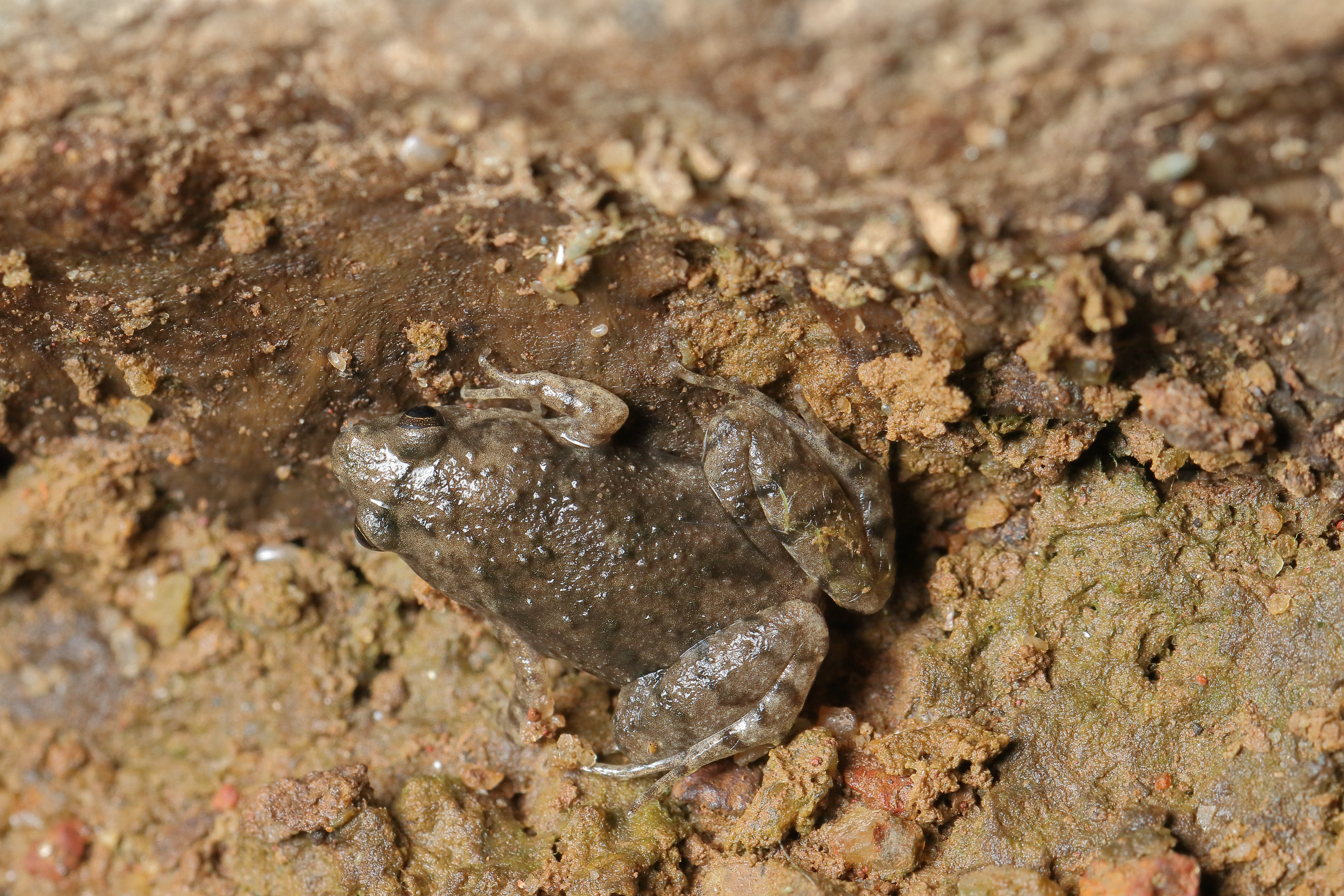
Dorsal view.

== Distribution and habitat ==
The exact distribution of M. kodial is uncertain, but it is believed to be restricted to a small geographical area around Mangalore on the west coast of India, where its typical habitat is marshy vegetation with open grassland with herbs and shrubs. However, it is not closely related to any of the native Indian Microhyla species, and genetic analysis indicates that its closest relatives are Microhyla species in Southeast Asia, namely the Microhyla achatina clade. The area in which it was found is also known to have formerly been a dumping area for imported timber. Thus, it has been speculated that M. kodial is actually native to Southeast Asia and was introduced to India on timber shipments, where it established a small population. However, the subsequent discovery of the closely related M. irrawaddy in the dry savannas of central Myanmar indicates that members of the M. achatina clade are capable of dispersing westwards and potentially surviving in the Indian Subcontinent's drier habitats, supporting M. kodial being a native species.
