= Nanohyla marmorata =

Conservation status
- Least Concern (IUCN 3.1)

Scientific classification
- Kingdom: Animalia
- Phylum: Chordata
- Class: Amphibia
- Order: Anura
- Family: Microhylidae
- Genus: Nanohyla
- Species: N. marmorata

Binomial name
- Nanohyla marmorata (Bain and Truong, 2004)

Synonyms
- Microhyla marmorata Bain and Truong, 2004; Microhyla pulverata Bain and Truong, 2004

Species of frog

Nanohyla marmorata is a species of frog in the family Microhylidae. It is found in Laos and Vietnam. It is not considered threatened by the IUCN.

== Taxonomy ==
N. marmorata was formerly placed in the genus Microhyla, but a 2021 study using morphological and phylogenetic evidence moved nine species (including N. marmorata) to a new genus, Nanohyla.

N. marmorata was described in 2004 alongside another species, Microhyla pulverata; however, M. pulverata is now believed to be a junior synonym of N. marmorata based on phylogenetic evidence.
