= Microhyla superciliaris =

Conservation status
- Least Concern (IUCN 3.1)

Scientific classification
- Kingdom: Animalia
- Phylum: Chordata
- Class: Amphibia
- Order: Anura
- Family: Microhylidae
- Genus: Microhyla
- Species: M. superciliaris

Binomial name
- Microhyla superciliaris Parker, 1928

Species of frog

Microhyla superciliaris is a species of frog in the family Microhylidae. It is found in Peninsular Malaysia and Sumatra (Indonesia). Its type locality is Batu Caves, which have given it its common name, Batu Cave rice frog. The type locality is a limestone crag area surrounded by lowland forest. In Sumatra it is found in forested areas. Breeding presumably takes place in slow-flowing rivers.
