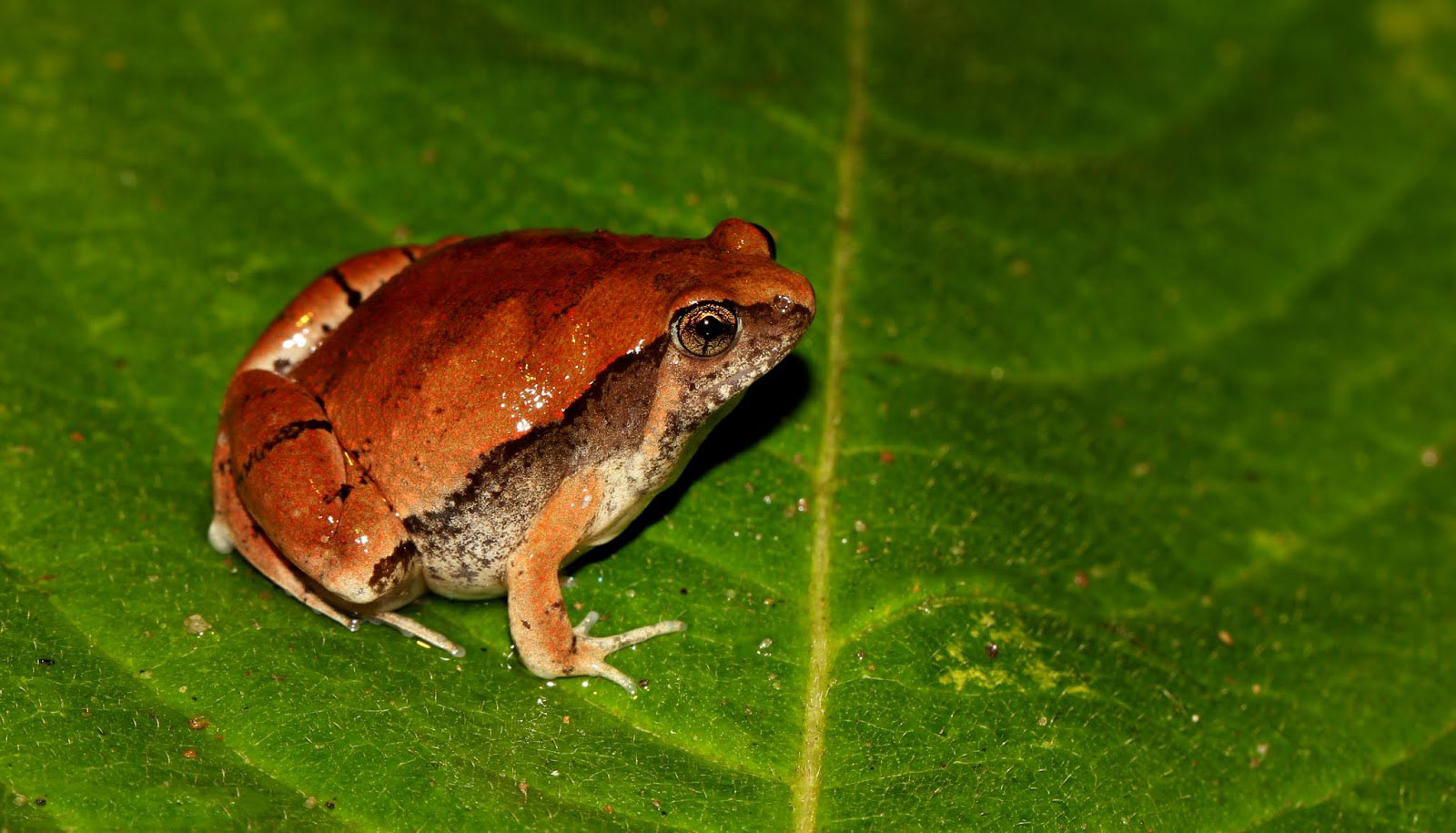

Scientific classification
- Kingdom: Animalia
- Phylum: Chordata
- Class: Amphibia
- Order: Anura
- Family: Microhylidae
- Genus: Microhyla
- Species: M. mihintalei

Binomial name
- Microhyla mihintalei Wijayathilaka, Garg, Senevirathne, Karunarathna, Biju, and Meegaskumbura, 2016

= Microhyla mihintalei =

Species of frog

Microhyla mihintalei (vernacular name: red narrow-mouthed frog or Mihintale red narrow-mouthed frog) is a species of frog in the family Microhylidae. It is endemic to Sri Lanka.

== Taxonomy ==
Earlier thought to be the same species as Microhyla rubra, several morphological differences suggested that the Sri Lankan populations are different from their Indian counterparts. Thus the Sri Lankan populations were elevated to a new species.

== Etymology ==
The specific name mihintalei is named after the Mihintale. Mihintale is also considered as one of the earliest sanctuaries in the world.

== Description ==
Snout to vent size of the adult males is 21.7–27.3 mm (0.9–1.1 in); the only female in the type series is 24.4 mm (1.0 in). Head is small. The tympanum is indistinct. Supratympanic fold is distinct. Vomerine ridge is absent. Forelimbs are shorter than hand length. Fingers are short and without adhesive discs. Subarticular tubercles are prominent and round in shape. Palmar tubercles are present. Hindlimbs are long, thin and tips are without discs. Hindlimbs are webbed.

The dorsumis light reddish-brown in color. A faint light grayish band extends from behind the eye to the groin region. Tympanic area and lateral sides of head are dark grayish. Groin is light gray with black patches. There are two distinct narrow black streaks runs from the snout to the groin. Thigh and tibia light are brown in color. They are marked with irregular black markings. A narrow black patch is visible from anal opening to near the knee. Venter is grayish. Throat and buccal pouch are dark blackish-brown.

== Ecology ==
It is confined to lowland dry zone of Sri Lanka. It mostly prefers shady areas, which are closer to streams and river banks. They are known to burrow in soil.
