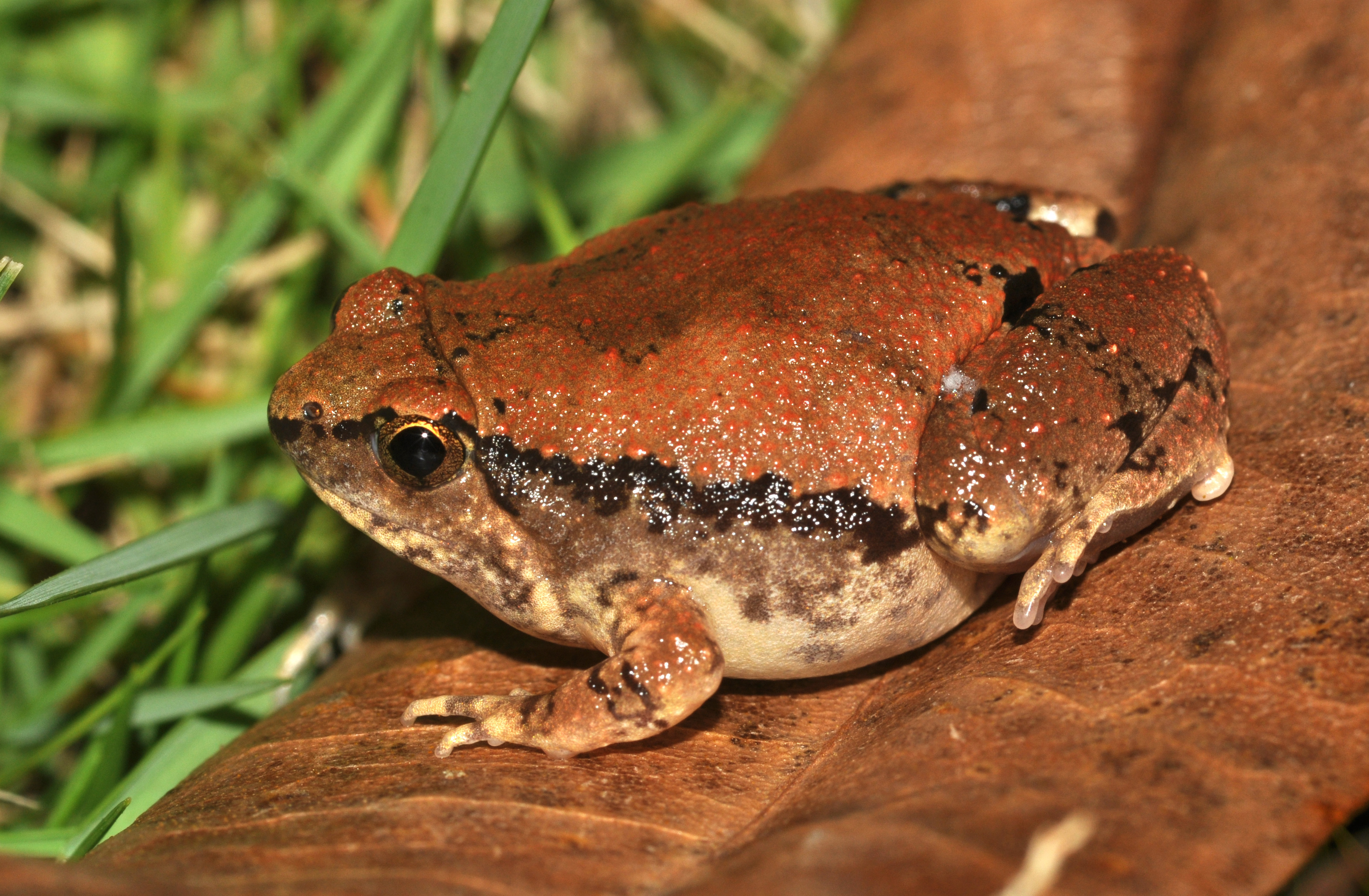

Conservation status
- Least Concern (IUCN 3.1)

Scientific classification
- Kingdom: Animalia
- Phylum: Chordata
- Class: Amphibia
- Order: Anura
- Family: Microhylidae
- Genus: Microhyla
- Species: M. rubra

Binomial name
- Microhyla rubra (Jerdon, 1854)

Synonyms
- Engystoma rubrum Jerdon, 1853; Copea fulva Steindachner, 1864

= Microhyla rubra =

Species of amphibian

Microhyla rubra is a species of narrow-mouthed frog endemic to India. Earlier thought to exist also in Sri Lanka, new studies suggested that the Sri Lankan population is a separate species, M. mihintalei.

== Description ==
Its habit is stout. Its snout is rounded, a little shorter than the diameter of the orbit. The interorbital space is broader than the upper eyelid. Its fingers are moderate: the first is much shorter than second. Its toes are moderate, one-third webbed. The tips of fingers and toes are not swollen. The subarticular tubercles are distinct; two are large, oval, compressed, metatarsal tubercles. The outer is larger than the inner. The tibio-tarsal articulation reaches somewhat beyond the shoulder, but not to the eye. The skin is smooth, reddish brown above, with darker sides. A dark brown line runs from the tip of the snout through the eye along the side of the back to the groin. A dark brown mark crosses the thigh, beginning on the loin. The limbs have more or less distinct dark cross bars. A dark X-shaped marking appears on the anterior portion of the back, commencing between the eyes. Below is whitish, immaculate or with a few brown dots on the throat. The male has a subgular vocal sac, and the throat black.

From snout to vent is 1.2 inches. Some adults have been observed dwelling in elephant dung.

== Tadpole ==
The tadpole rubra has a transparent body with a long, tapering whip-like tail. In dorsal view, the body is differentiated into a longer and wider anterior region and a narrower posterior region. The anterior region is almost twice as long and wide as the posterior. The eyes are small and directed slightly dorsolaterally, bulbous. The entire eye is visible through the epidermis due to dearth of pigmentation. The snout is rounded. The head and body are posterior to eyes with sides parallel to each other. The nares are closed, narial depressions are visible and located immediately anterior to two small concentrated patches of pigment, anterodorsolaterally directed, and closer to the snout tip than to pupils. The nasolacrimal duct is apparent. The mouth is narrow, superior, lower and upper-lips both visible. The tail is long and tapering, with a whip-like flagellum.

Tadpoles lack keratinized mouth parts and have a dorsoterminal mouth. They have six papillae (scallops) on the lower lip, but the number varies with developmental stage.

Tadpoles' preferred habitats are ephemeral pools that have fewer aquatic predators. Since such pools dry rapidly after the rainy period tadpoles adapt by having a rapid growth rate. M. rubra tadpoles live in water close to the surface and feed on plankton and suspended food particles.
