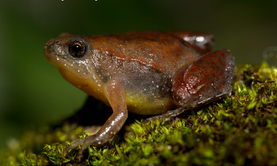

Conservation status
- Endangered (IUCN 3.1)

Scientific classification
- Kingdom: Animalia
- Phylum: Chordata
- Class: Amphibia
- Order: Anura
- Family: Microhylidae
- Genus: Microhyla
- Species: M. zeylanica

Binomial name
- Microhyla zeylanica Parker and Osman-Hill, 1949

= Microhyla zeylanica =

Species of frog

Microhyla zeylanica. the Sri Lanka rice frog or Sri Lanka narrow-mouth frog, is a species of frog in the family Microhylidae. It is endemic to Sri Lanka. Its natural habitats are subtropical or tropical moist montane forests, subtropical or tropical high-altitude grassland, swamps, freshwater marshes, and intermittent freshwater marshes. It is threatened by habitat loss.
