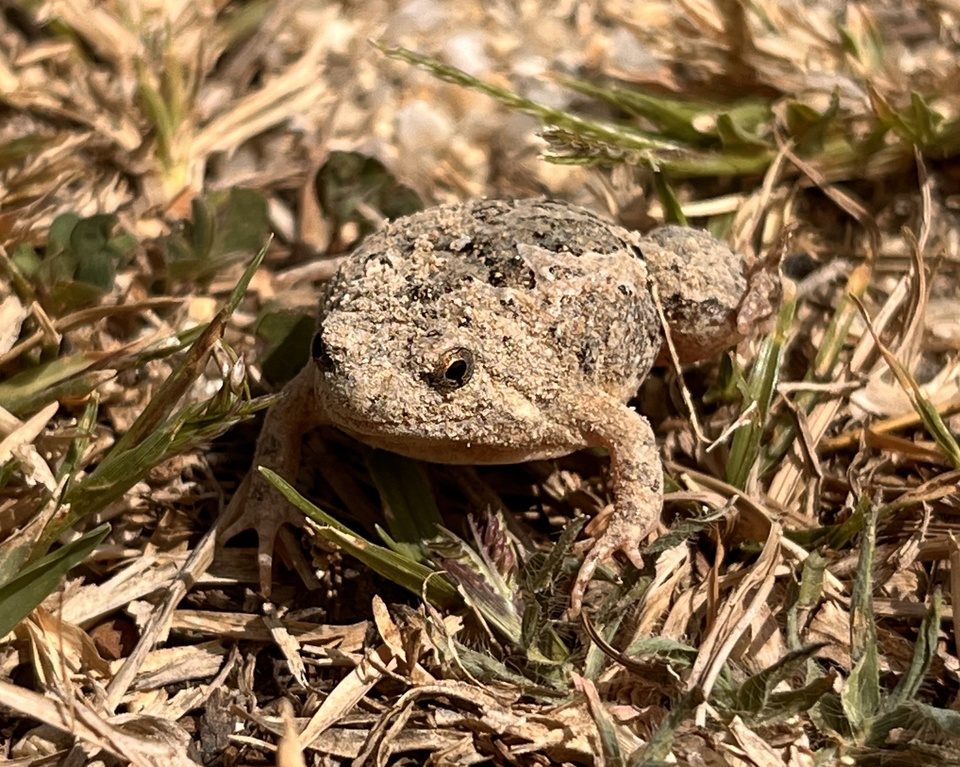

Conservation status
- Data Deficient (IUCN 3.1)

Scientific classification
- Kingdom: Animalia
- Phylum: Chordata
- Class: Amphibia
- Order: Anura
- Family: Microhylidae
- Genus: Microhyla
- Species: M. picta

Binomial name
- Microhyla picta Schenkel, 1901

= Microhyla picta =

Species of frog

Microhyla picta is a species of frog in the family Microhylidae. It is endemic to Vietnam. Its natural habitats are swamps, freshwater marshes, and intermittent freshwater marshes.
