= Mixtured pygmy frog =

Conservation status
- Least Concern (IUCN 3.1)

Scientific classification
- Kingdom: Animalia
- Phylum: Chordata
- Class: Amphibia
- Order: Anura
- Family: Microhylidae
- Genus: Microhyla
- Species: M. mixtura

Binomial name
- Microhyla mixtura Liu & Hu, 1966

Species of amphibian

The mixtured pygmy frog (Microhyla mixtura) is a species of frog in the family Microhylidae. It is endemic to China. Its natural habitats are temperate grassland, subtropical or tropical dry lowland grassland, rivers, intermittent freshwater marshes, and irrigated land. It is not considered threatened by the IUCN.
