= Microhyla karunaratnei =

Conservation status
- Endangered (IUCN 3.1)

Scientific classification
- Kingdom: Animalia
- Phylum: Chordata
- Class: Amphibia
- Order: Anura
- Family: Microhylidae
- Genus: Microhyla
- Species: M. karunaratnei

Binomial name
- Microhyla karunaratnei Fernando and Siriwardhane, 1996

Species of frog

Microhyla karunaratnei is a species of frog in the family Microhylidae. It is endemic to southern Sri Lanka. It is also known as the Karunaratne's narrow-mouth frog or Karunaratne's narrow-mouthed frog. The specific name karunaratnei honours G. Punchi Banda Karunaratne, a Sri Lankan naturalist.

== Description ==
Adult males measure 16–17 mm (0.6–0.7 in) and adult females, based on a single specimen, about 19 mm (0.7 in) in snout–vent length. The snout is blunt. The canthus rostralis is rounded. The tympanum is hidden. The fingers have poorly developed discs and no webbing. The toes have webbing, lateral fringes, and more developed discs. Skin is smooth. The dorsum is pinkish grey-brown, and there is a blackish lateral stripe. There is a dark brown mid-dorsal marking, but this is indistinct in some specimens. The venter is white with black marbling.

== Habitat and conservation ==
Microhyla karunaratnei occurs in shaded, wet leaf litter in tropical moist forest at elevations of 515–1,110 m (1,690–3,642 ft) above sea level. The tadpoles develop in wetlands, including old abandoned gem mining pits, the creation of which may actually have benefited the species. However, Microhyla karunaratnei is an uncommon species that is known only from two sites. It is threatened by habitat loss caused by expanding cardamom plantations and by agricultural pollution. It occurs in the Sinharaja Forest Reserve.
