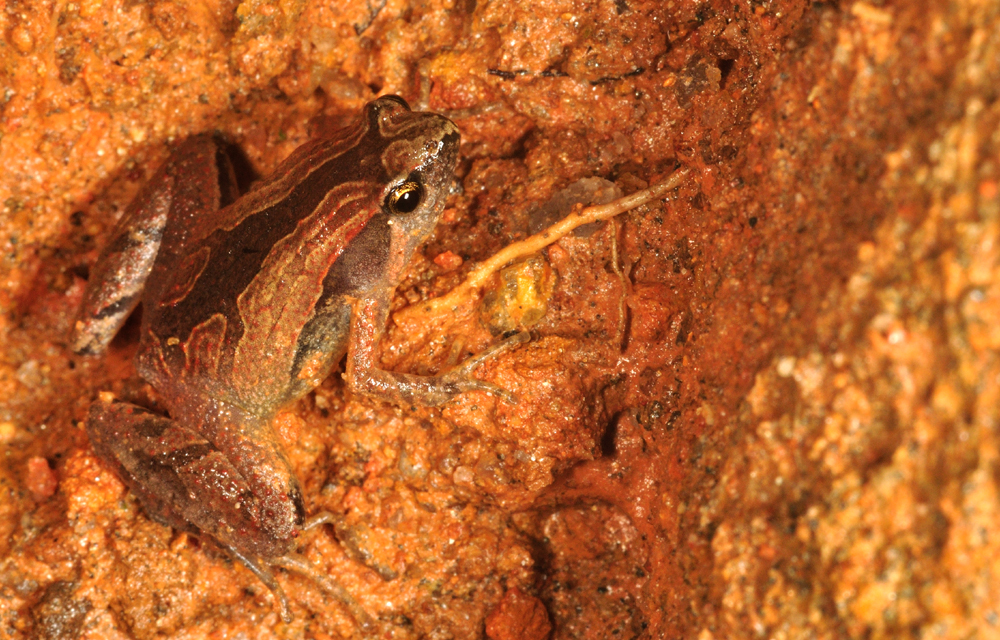

Conservation status
- Endangered (IUCN 3.1)

Scientific classification
- Kingdom: Animalia
- Phylum: Chordata
- Class: Amphibia
- Order: Anura
- Family: Microhylidae
- Genus: Microhyla
- Species: M. sholigari

Binomial name
- Microhyla sholigari Dutta and Ray, 2000

= Microhyla sholigari =

Species of amphibian

Microhyla sholigari is a species of microhylid frog endemic to southern India. It was described from the Biligirirangan Hills in Chamarajanagar district, Karnataka and is named after the Soliga tribal people living in the forests in and around these hills. The frog was thought to be endemic to the Western Ghats and known only from the type locality and another location in Kerala and was listed as an Endangered species. A recent study reported the species from 15 localities in the central Western Ghats with individuals sighted near the Bannerghatta National Park, Bangalore, Karnataka. The study supplemented the original species description with color photographs, call recordings and provided a re-assessment of the threat status as per the IUCN Red List and suggest the status as Least-concern species because the criteria for classifying it as an endangered species are no longer fulfilled.

== Description ==
Microhyla sholigari is a small sized frog with adult males measuring 15.9–16.2 mm (N = 3) and females measuring 16.5–19.2 mm (N = 4). Individuals of this species have a pointed snout in dorsal and ventral views. The snout protrudes beyond the lower jaw in ventral view. The tympanum is indistinct. The head is wider than long and the throat is buff colored with brown pigmentation. Finger and toe tips are dilated with reduced webbing between toes. The dorsal skin is smooth with small tubercles increasing in density towards the vent. Dorsally, the skin coloration is brown with pale red tubercles. Forelimbs are reddish brown in color with black cross bands. The lateral aspect of the body is greyish black with the color fading towards the groin. Anterior portion of the thigh has a black band terminating just short of the groin. In life, the frog is primarily brown in color with contrasting black markings on dorsum, hands, feet and flanks. A dark trifoliar pattern on dorsum is present from the region between the eyes and up to the vent. This pattern appears like a sword with a hilt-guard.

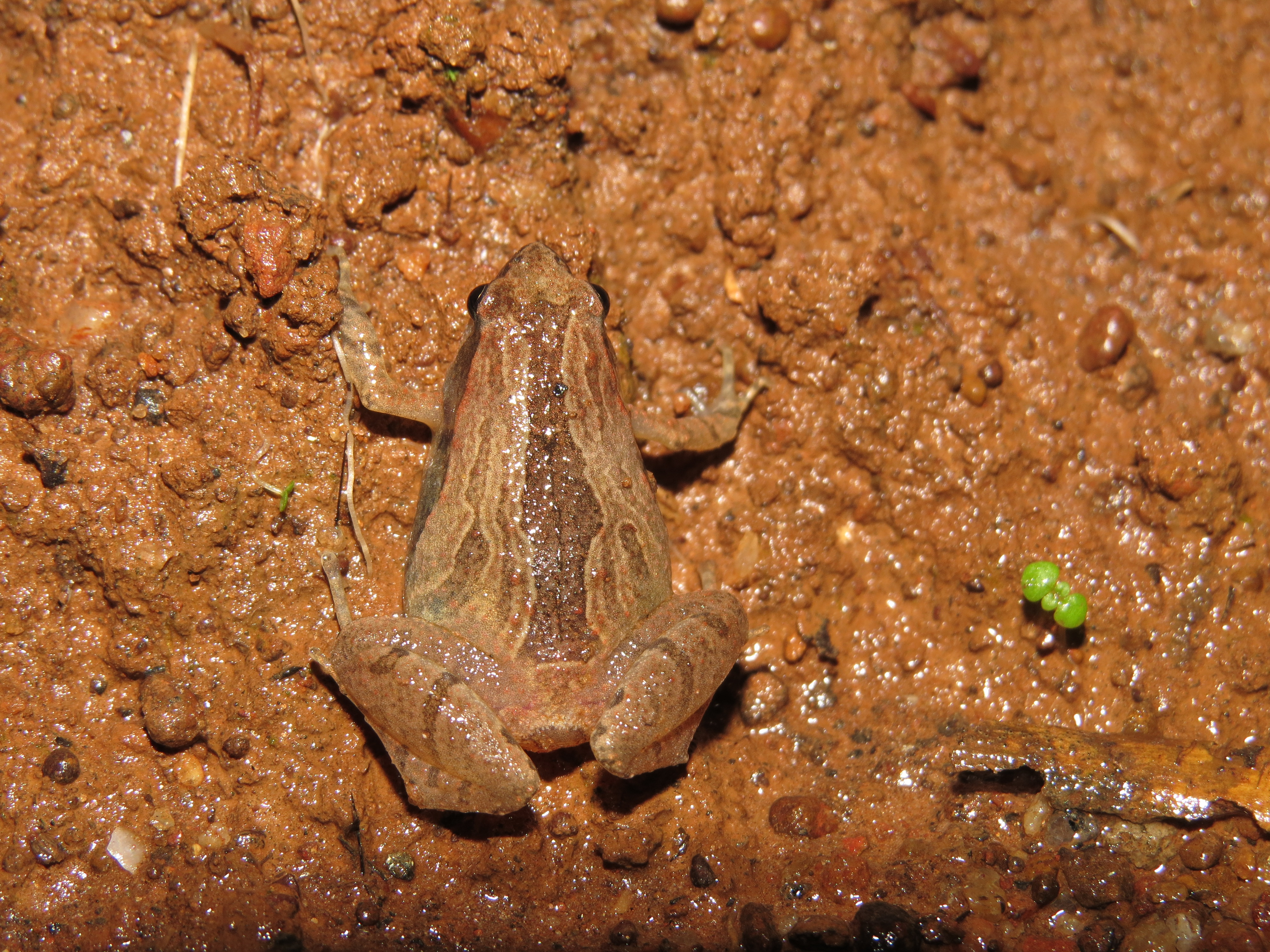
Microhyla sholigari in dorsal view

The iris is golden yellow with brown mottling and a black pupil. The advertisement calls of M. sholigari sound like a sharp 'Zeeeeee…..Zeeeee…..Zeeeee…' and are heard as a chorus with each call being 0.76 ± 0.04 s (range: 0.65–0.81 s) long in duration. The calls have 52–67 pulses (mean ± SE: 63 ± 4, N = 13) with a mean dominant frequency of 3596 ± 98 Hz (range: 3375–3704). Genetically, the species is closely related to M. laterite.

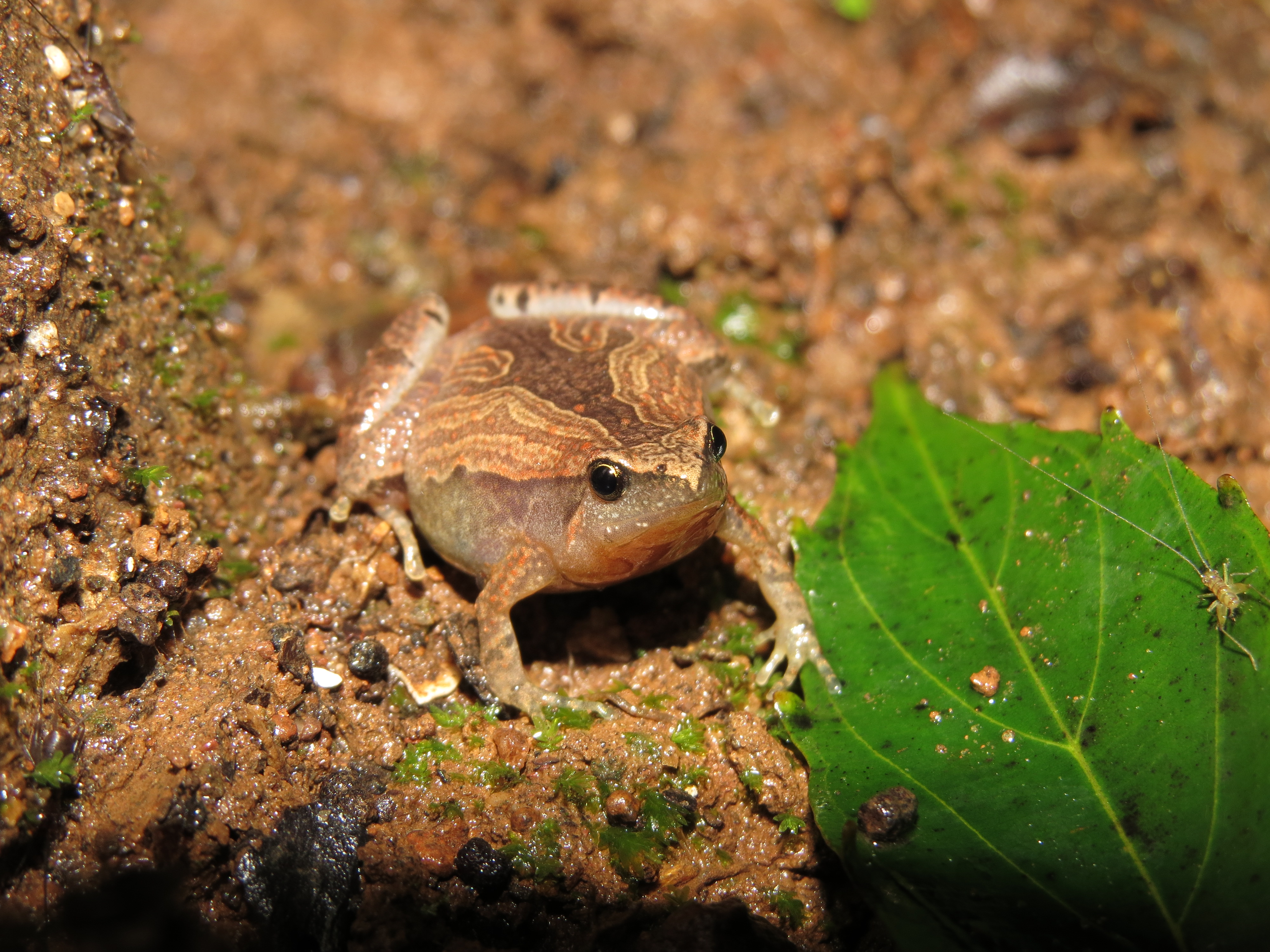
Anterior view of M. sholigari

== Ecology and natural history ==
Microhyla sholigari is a terrestrial species and common in and around human settlements, open areas in forests, and around ponds. They typically inhabit areas with dense grass clumps and vocalize between 18:00 h to about 23:00 h during the months of June to October. They breed in shallow water bodies and possibly in slow flowing streams in forested areas. They have overlapping calls with other M. sholigari individuals and with ground crickets. It is threatened by habitat loss, at present mostly driven by urbanization but in the past by agricultural expansion and wood extraction.

== Distribution ==
Microhyla sholigari is known to occur in a widespread area of south India. The extent of occurrence is about 28,304.6 km^{2}. The frogs are locally abundant with over 50 calling male individuals/100 sq. m in locations such as Bisle, Biligiri Rangaswamy Hills Tiger Reserve and near Shivanalli, Bangalore, Karnataka.
