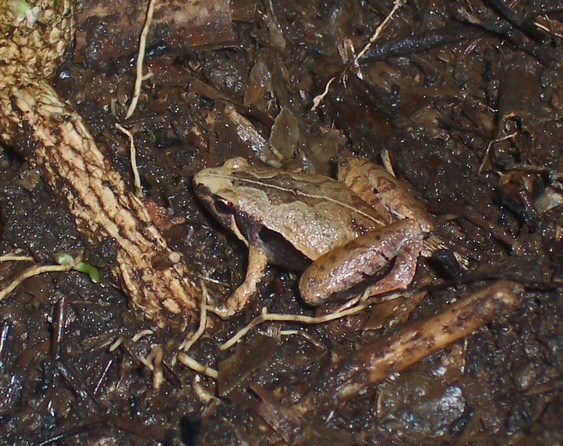
- Microhyla achatina

Scientific classification
- Kingdom: Animalia
- Phylum: Chordata
- Class: Amphibia
- Order: Anura
- Family: Microhylidae
- Subfamily: Microhylinae
- Genus: Microhyla; Tschudi, 1838

Type species
- Microhyla achatina Tschudi, 1838

Species
- Over 40, see text.

= Microhyla =

Genus of amphibians

Microhyla, commonly known as the rice frogs or narrow-mouthed frogs, is a genus of frogs in the family Microhylidae. It consists of 42 species of diminutive frogs. Members of this genus are widespread from Ryukyu Is. in Japan, and throughout South-east Asia, (China, Sumatra, Java, Bali, Borneo, India and Sri Lanka).

== Taxonomy ==
In 2021, nine species of Microhyla were moved to Nanohyla on the basis of morphological and phylogenetic differences. Microhyla pulverata was found to be a junior synonym of Nanohyla marmorata based on phylogenetic evidence.

== Diagnosis ==
According to Seshadri et al. (2016), this genus can be diagnosed using the following set of criteria: Adult frogs are of small size; pupil circular; skin on dorsum smooth; lateral side of body with markings from back of eye to vent; supratympanic fold present in adults; paratoid glands are absent, fingers without webbing, finger tips may or may not be dilated; oval tongue, its margin is entire and free at the base; the diameter of eye is smaller than snout; a thin layer of skin hides the tympanum; tubercles on hand distinct; distinct oval shaped inner metatarsal tubercle and rounded outer metatarsal tubercle; webbing in feet, rudimentary.

== Evolutionary relationships ==
The genus Microhyla is closely related to Glyphoglossus within the family Microhylidae. Members of the genus Microhyla began diversifying from the most common ancestor around 45 million years ago and this resulted in forming Metaphrynella and Microhyla. However, ascertaining the phylogenetic relationship of frogs within Microhyla has been difficult as many species are not monophyletic.

A 2021 study on the relationship between Microhyla and Glyphoglossus found that nine species within Microhyla actually belong to a separate lineage. They have been subsequently moved to the new genus, Nanohyla.

== Species ==
The following species are recognised in the genus Microhyla:

Binomial Name and Author	Common Name
Microhyla achatina Tschudi, 1838	Javan rice frog, Javan chorus frog, Javanese narrow-mouthed frog
Microhyla aurantiventris Nguyen, Poyarkov, Nguyen, Nguyen, Tran, Gorin, Murphy, and Nguyen, 2019	Orange-bellied narrow-mouth frog
Microhyla beilunensis Zhang, Fei, Ye, Wang, Wang, and Jiang, 2018	Beilun pygmy frog
Microhyla berdmorei (Blyth, 1856)	Pegu rice frog, Berdmore's narrow-mouthed frog, Burmese microhylid frog, Berdmore's chorus frog
Microhyla borneensis Parker, 1928	Borneo rice frog, Borneo narrow-mouthed frog, Bornean narrow-mouthed frog, Bornean chorus frog, long-snouted frog
Microhyla butleri Boulenger, 1900	Butler's rice frog, Butler's ricefrog, Butler's narrow-mouthed Toad, Butler's pigmy frog, painted chorus frog, tubercled pygmy frog, noisy frog
Microhyla chakrapanii Pillai, 1977	Mayabunder rice frog, Chakrapani's narrow-mouthed frog, bilateral banded frog
Microhyla darevskii	Darevsky's Narrow-Mouth Frog, Darevsky's Pigmy Narrow-Mouth Frog (original publication).
Microhyla darreli Garg et al., 2018 "2019"	Darrel's chorus frog
Microhyla eos Biju, Garg, Kamei, and Maheswaran, 2019	Arunachal chorus frog
Microhyla fanjingshanensis Li, Zhang, Xu, Lv, and Jiang, 2019	Fanjing Mountain pygmy frog
Microhyla fissipes Boulenger, 1884	Ornamented pygmy frog, ornata microhylid frog, Malayan bullfrog, ornate narrow-mouthed frog, ornate narrowmouth frog, ornate pigmy frog, ornate chorus frog
Microhyla fodiens Poyarkov, Gorin, Zaw, Kretova, Gogoleva, Pawangkhanant, and Che, 2019	Burrowing narrow-mouth frog
Microhyla fusca Andersson, 1942	Brown rice frog, Dalat pigmy frog
Microhyla gadjahmadai Atmaja, Hamidy, Arisuryanti, Matsui, and Smith, 2018
Microhyla heymonsi Vogt, 1911	Taiwan rice frog, Heymon's ricefrog, dark-sided chorus frog, arcuate-spotted pygmy frog, Heymon's narrow-mouthed frog, Heymon's narrow-mouthed toad, burrowing microhylid frog, black-sided narrow-mouthed frog, black-flanked pigmy frog
Microhyla irrawaddy Poyarkov, Gorin, Zaw, Kretova, Gogoleva, Pawangkhanant, and Che, 2019	Irrawaddy narrowmouth frog
Microhyla karunaratnei Fernando & Siriwardhane, 1996
Microhyla kodial Kumar and Aravind, 2018	Mangaluru narrow-mouthed frog
Microhyla kuramotoi Matsui & Tominaga, 2020
Microhyla laterite Seshadri et al., 2016	Laterite narrow-mouthed frog
Microhyla maculifera Inger, 1989	Sabah rice frog
Microhyla malang Matsui, 2011
Microhyla mantheyi Das, Yaakob, and Sukumaran, 2007
Microhyla mihintalei Wijayathilaka et al., 2016	Sri Lanka red narrow-mouthed frog
Microhyla minuta	Tiny Narrow-Mouth Frog, Tiny Pigmy Narrow-Mouth Frog
Microhyla mixtura Liu & Hu in Hu, Zhao, & Liu, 1966	Chinese rice frog, mixtured pigmy frog
Microhyla mukhlesuri Hasan et al. 2014
Microhyla mymensinghensis Hasan et al. 2014
Microhyla nilphamariensis Howlader et al. 2015
Microhyla okinavensis Stejneger, 1901	Okinawa rice frog
Microhyla orientalis Matsui, Hamidy & Eto, 2013
Microhyla ornata (Duméril & Bibron, 1841)	Ant frog, ornate narrow-mouthed frog, ornate narrowmouth frog, ornate rice frog, ornate ricefrog, black-throated frog
Microhyla palmipes Boulenger, 1897	Pengalengan rice frog, palmated chorus frog, palmated narrow-mouthed frog
Microhyla picta Schenkel, 1901	Painted rice frog
Microhyla pineticola	Pine Narrow-Mouth Frog, Pine Pigmy Narrow-Mouth Frog
Microhyla pulchra (Hallowell, 1861)	Guangdong rice frog, marbled pigmy frog, yellow-legged pigmy frog, beautiful pygmy frog, painted frog, yellow-legged narrow-mouthed frog
Microhyla rubra (Jerdon, 1854)	Guangdong rice frog, red narrow-mouthed frog, densely spotted microhylid frog
Microhyla sholigari Dutta & Ray, 2000
Microhyla superciliaris Parker, 1928	Batu Cave rice frog
Microhyla taraiensis Khatiwada, 2017
Microhyla zeylanica Parker & Osman-Hill, 1949	Sri Lanka rice frog

In central Vietnam, several new species of Microhyla have been described in the 2000s:

- Microhyla darevskii: Mount Ngọc Linh, Kon Tum Province
- Microhyla minuta: Đồng Nai Province
- Microhyla pineticola: Lâm Đồng Province and Đắk Lắk Province

Several new species of Microhyla have been described since 2018.

== Phylogeny ==
The following phylogeny of the genus Microhyla is from Khatiwada, et al. (2017). 27 species are listed, including various newly described species from South Asia. (Note: the chart below includes some species that have since been moved to Nanohyla including N. annectens and N. perparva.)

- Microhyla
  - Microhyla achatina
  - - - Microhyla nanapollexa
      - - Microhyla petrigena
        - - Microhyla marmorata
          - Microhyla annectens
    - - - Microhyla pulchra
        - - Microhyla berdmorei
          - Microhyla fowleri
      - - - - - Microhyla mymenshinghensis
              - - Microhyla fissipes
                - Microhyla mukhlesuri
            - - Microhyla okinavensis
              - Microhyla mixtura
          - - Microhyla heymonsi
            - - Microhyla mantheyi
              - - Microhyla malang
                - - Microhyla perparva
                  - Microhyla borneensis
        - - - Microhyla sholigari
            - Microhyla laterite
          - - - Microhyla superciliaris
              - - Microhyla palmipes
                - Microhyla butleri
            - - Microhyla rubra
              - - Microhyla taraiensis
                - - Microhyla ornata
                  - Microhyla nilphamariensis
