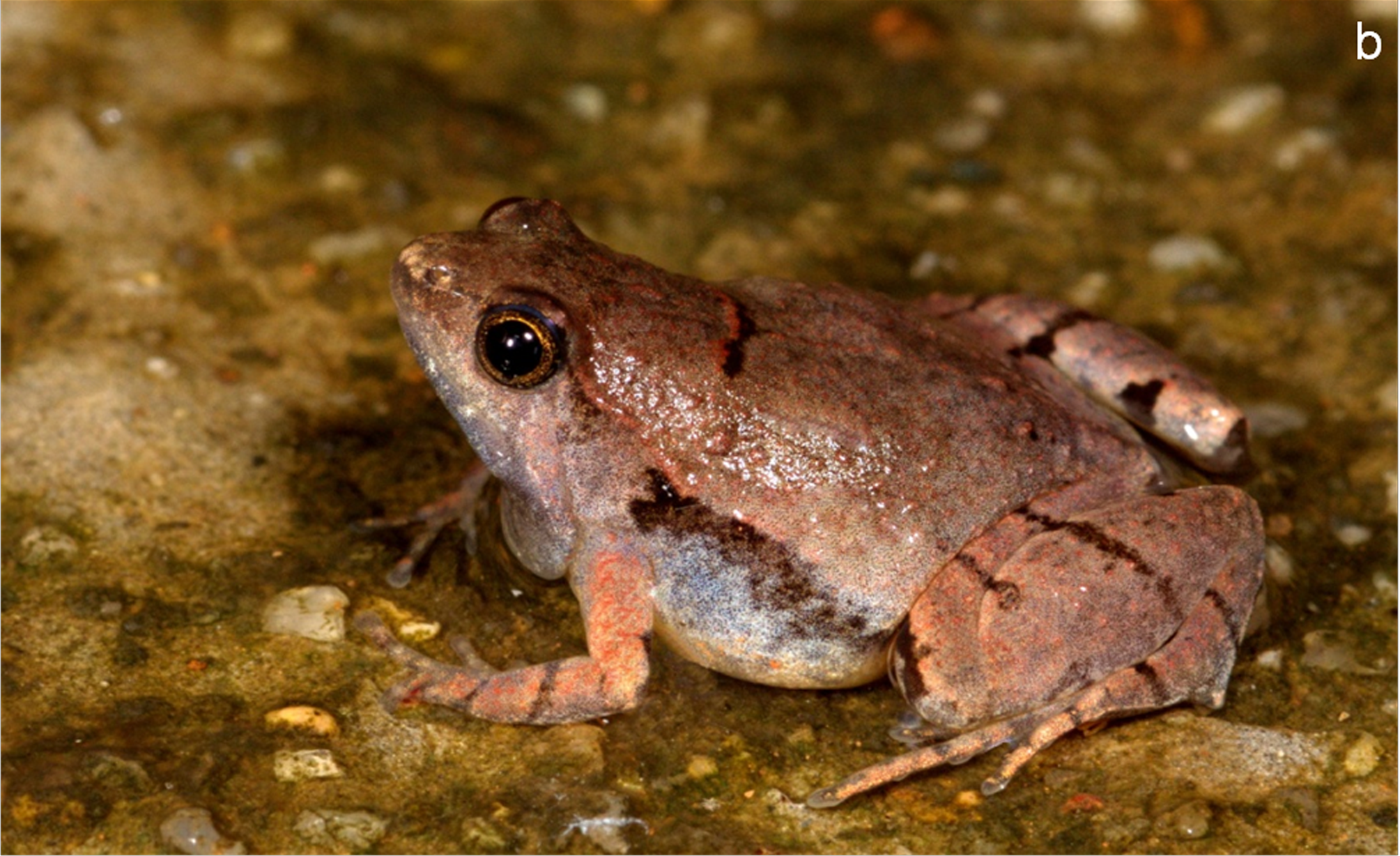
- Microhyla laterite, an adult male

Conservation status
- Endangered (IUCN 3.1)Suggested

Scientific classification
- Kingdom: Animalia
- Phylum: Chordata
- Class: Amphibia
- Order: Anura
- Family: Microhylidae
- Genus: Microhyla
- Species: M. laterite

Binomial name
- Microhyla laterite Seshadri et al., 2016
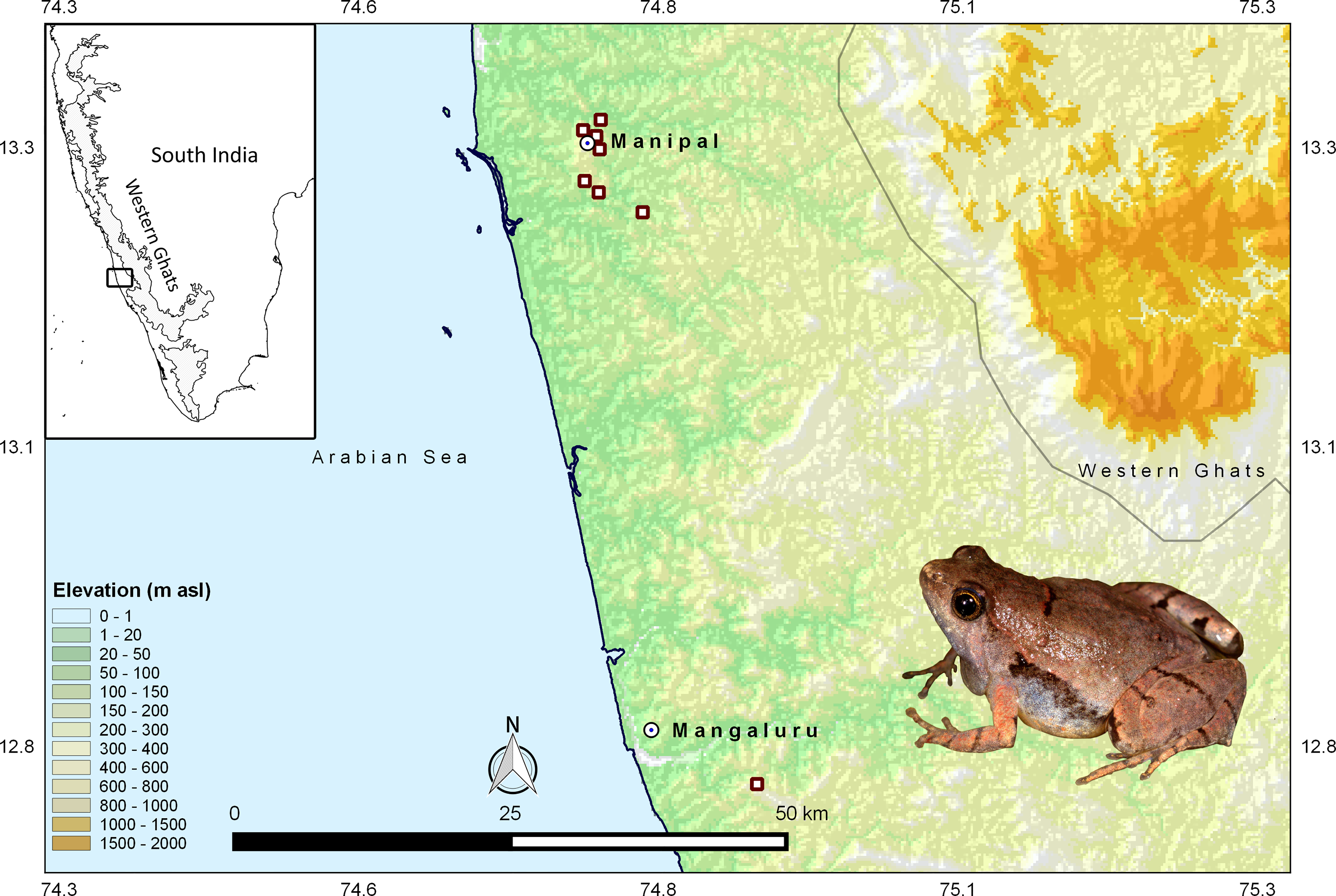

= Microhyla laterite =

Species of amphibian

Microhyla laterite or laterite narrow-mouthed frog is a species of frog discovered in Karnataka, India in 2016. It is known from ephemeral ponds forming in laterite soil along the coastal fringe adjoining the Karnataka Western Ghats.

== Description ==
Males measure 15–17 mm (0.59–0.67 in) and females, based on a single specimen only, 18 mm (0.71 in) in snout–vent length. Skin is smooth. The tympanum is hidden by skin. The colouration is overall pale brown with prominent black markings on the dorsum, hands, feet and flanks. There is a distinct black horizontal band, with a red leading edge, at level with the forelimbs. The vocal sac is deep purplish black when calling. The iris is golden yellow with brown mottling. The pupil is black. Ventral parts are creamy white except for the throat.

== Etymology ==
This species is named after the laterite rock formations in the type locality.

== Range and habitat ==
Microhyla laterite is only known from few localities in Udupi district and Konaje, both in the Karnataka state, at elevations of 50–80 m (160–260 ft) above sea level. The species occurs in laterite habitats often around human settlements in rural and semi-urban areas. They inhabit ephemeral ponds and other marshy areas, and also occur in wet paddy fields where males have been observed to vocalize from the embankment.

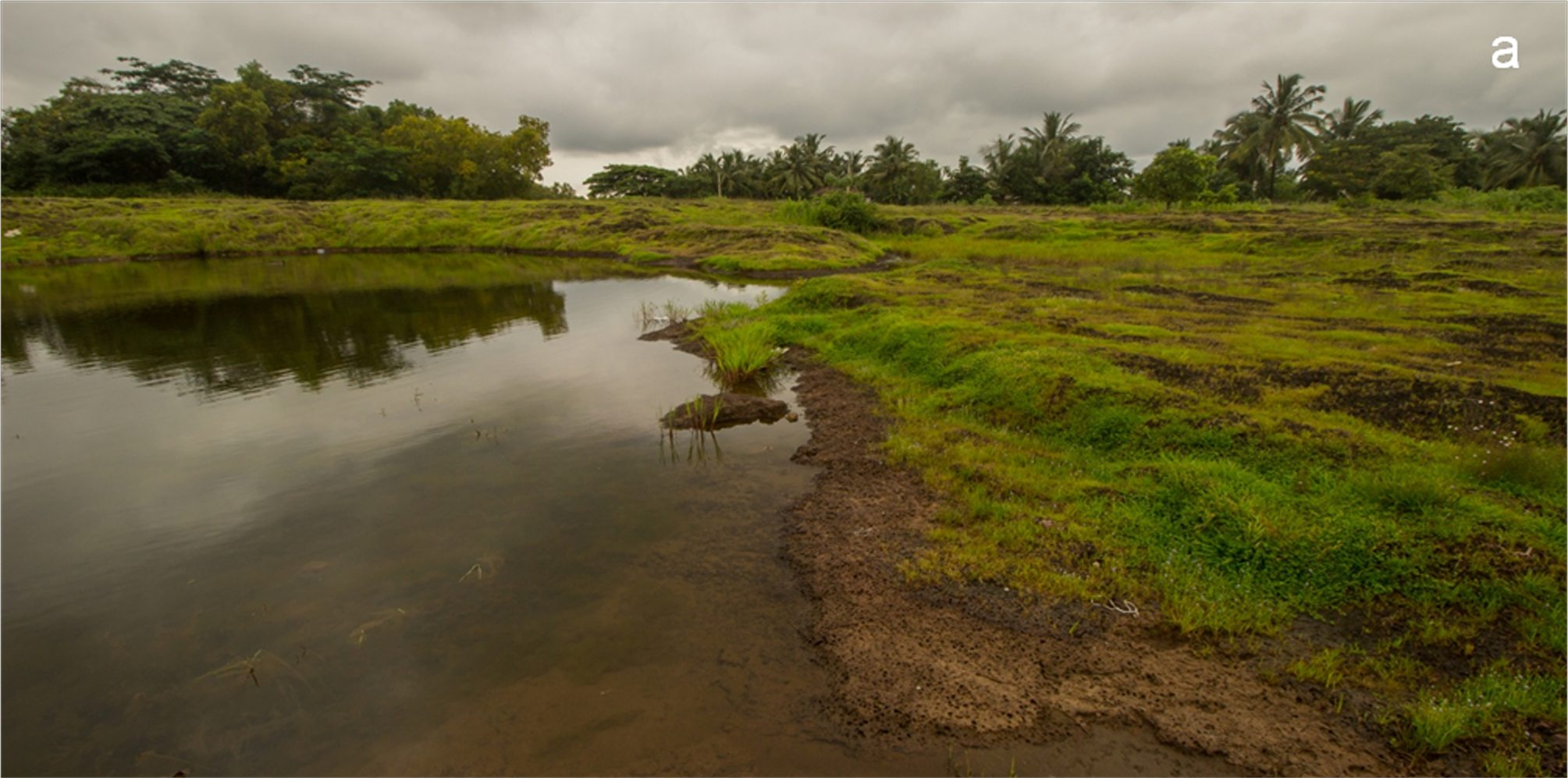
Microhyla laterite habitat: a laterite pool

The range of Microhyla laterite is adjacent to the Western Ghats, a recognized biodiversity hotspot. In contrast, the laterite areas are considered wastelands that receive no protection.

Because of ongoing threats to the habitat, and the very limited area of occurrence, Seshadri et al. suggest that the species should be considered "Endangered" following the criteria of the International Union for Conservation of Nature (IUCN) Red List.
