= Microhyla maculifera =

Conservation status
- Data Deficient (IUCN 3.1)

Scientific classification
- Kingdom: Animalia
- Phylum: Chordata
- Class: Amphibia
- Order: Anura
- Family: Microhylidae
- Genus: Microhyla
- Species: M. maculifera

Binomial name
- Microhyla maculifera Inger, 1989

Species of frog

Microhyla maculifera (common name: Sabah rice frog) is a species of frog in the family Microhylidae. It is endemic to Borneo, specifically to the Danum Valley Conservation Area in Sabah, Malaysia. It inhabits leaf litter on the forest floor and presumably breeds in small rain pools. Its habitat is well protected in the Danum Valley Conservation Area, but its small range makes it vulnerable to chance events.
