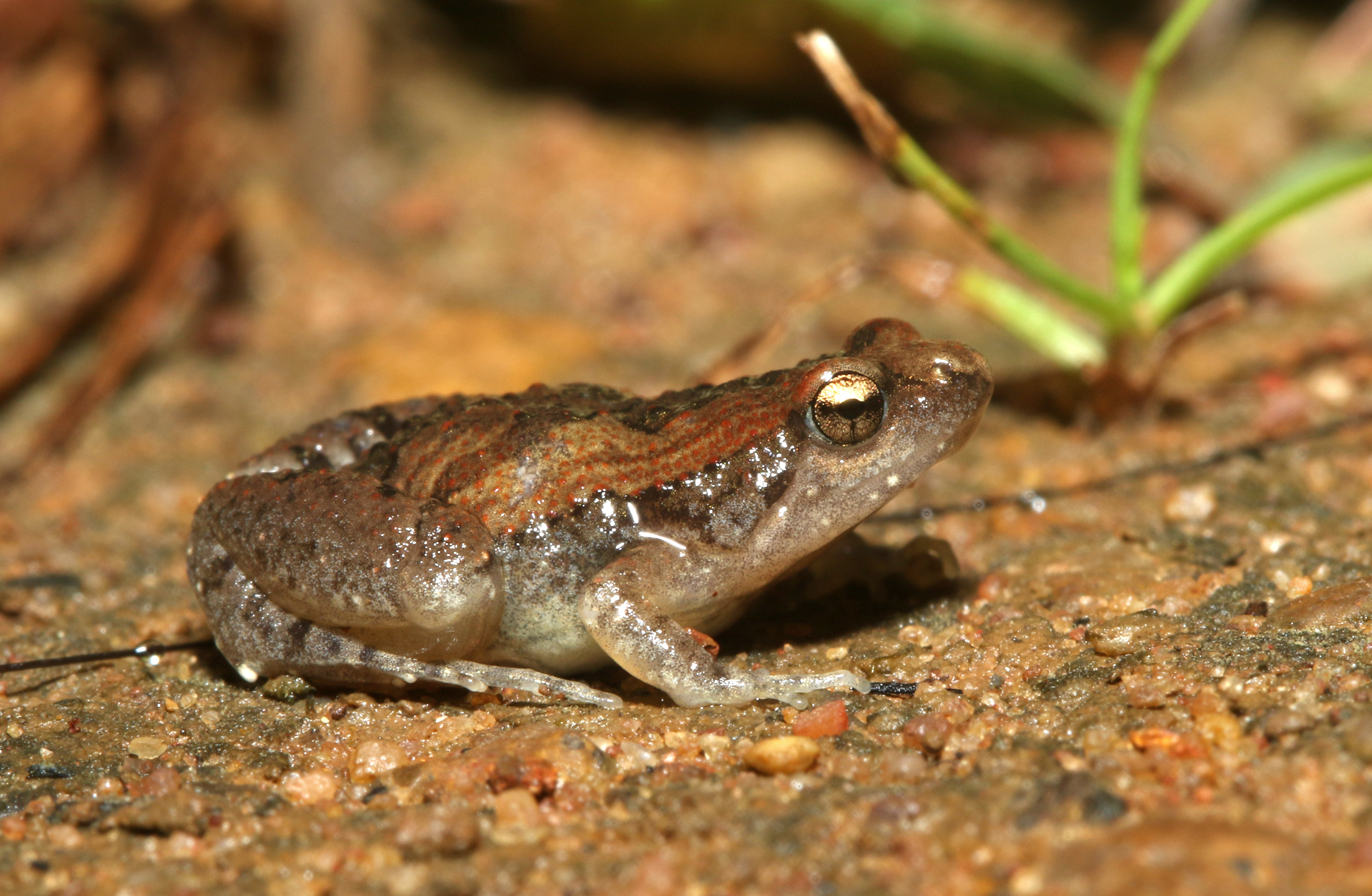

Scientific classification
- Kingdom: Animalia
- Phylum: Chordata
- Class: Amphibia
- Order: Anura
- Family: Microhylidae
- Genus: Microhyla
- Species: M. nilphamariensis

Binomial name
- Microhyla nilphamariensis Howlader, Nair, Gopalan, and Merilä, 2015

= Microhyla nilphamariensis =

Species of amphibian

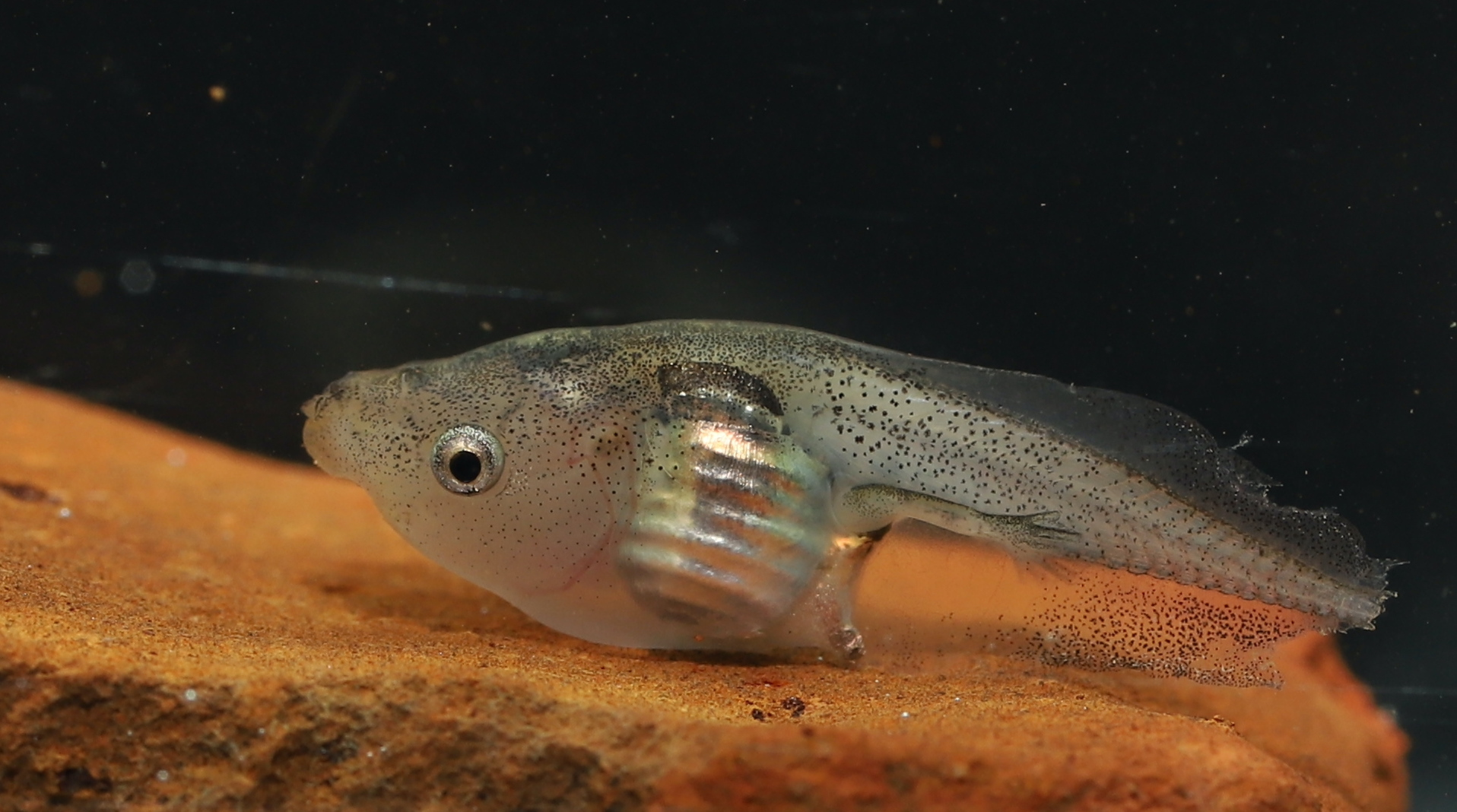
Tadpole of M. nilphamariensis

Microphyla nilphamariensis is a species of narrow-mouthed frog. It is found in Bangladesh, India, Nepal, and northern Pakistan.

== Description ==
Microhyla nilphamariensis is a small frog with a narrow, triangular shaped mouth. This frog is morphologically distinct from all other frogs in its genus as it has reduced webbing between toes. The basic dorsal coloration is light brown with a distinct dark brown diamond-shaped marking over the back. The throat and chest are brown, the belly is dull white and the limbs have dark cross bars.

== Habitat ==
A nocturnal species, it is active when raining and prefers moist environments. Specimens have been observed in a grassy field near ephemeral pools of water.
