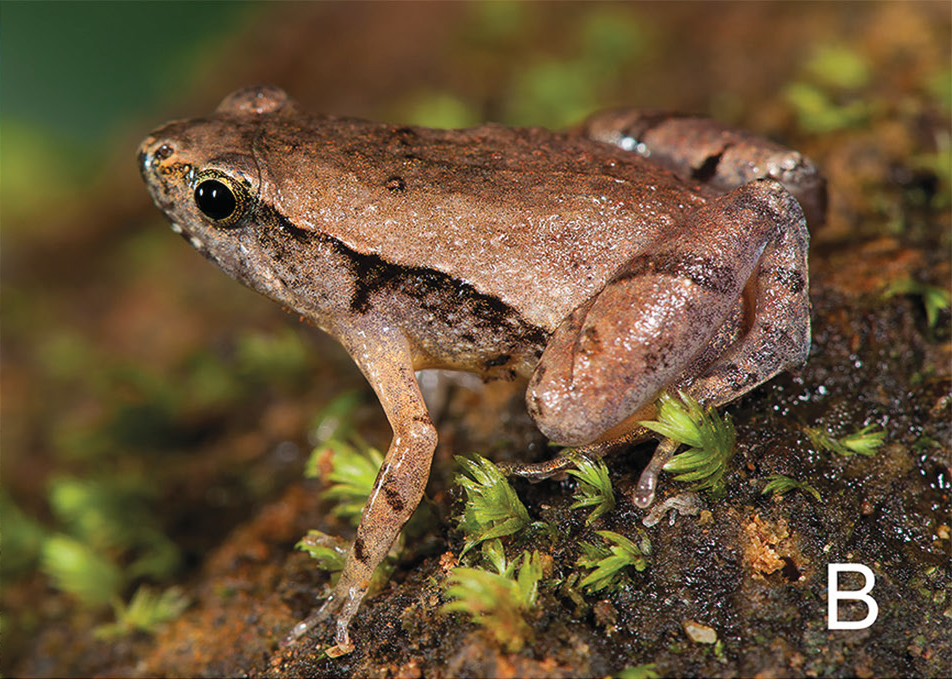
- Holotype in dorsolateral view

Scientific classification
- Kingdom: Animalia
- Phylum: Chordata
- Class: Amphibia
- Order: Anura
- Family: Microhylidae
- Genus: Microhyla
- Species: M. darreli

Binomial name
- Microhyla darreli Garg, Suyesh, Das, Jiang, Wijayathilaka, Amarasinghe, Alhadi, Vineeth, Aravind, Senevirathne, Meegaskumbura, and Biju, 2018 "2019"
- Microhyla darreli is only known from the Thiruvananthapuram district in the southern part of the Western Ghats

= Microhyla darreli =

Species of frog

Microhyla darreli is a species of frog in the family Microhylidae, the narrow-mouthed frogs. It is endemic to the Western Ghats south of the Palghat Gap in southern India. It is named for Darrel Frost, an American herpetologist, in recognition of the online database Amphibian Species of the World that he maintains. Accordingly, common name Darrel's chorus frog has been coined for this species.

== Distribution ==
Microhyla darreli is currently known from two localities in Thiruvananthapuram district in Kerala: its type locality Karamana, and Chathankod, some 50 km northeast of the type locality.

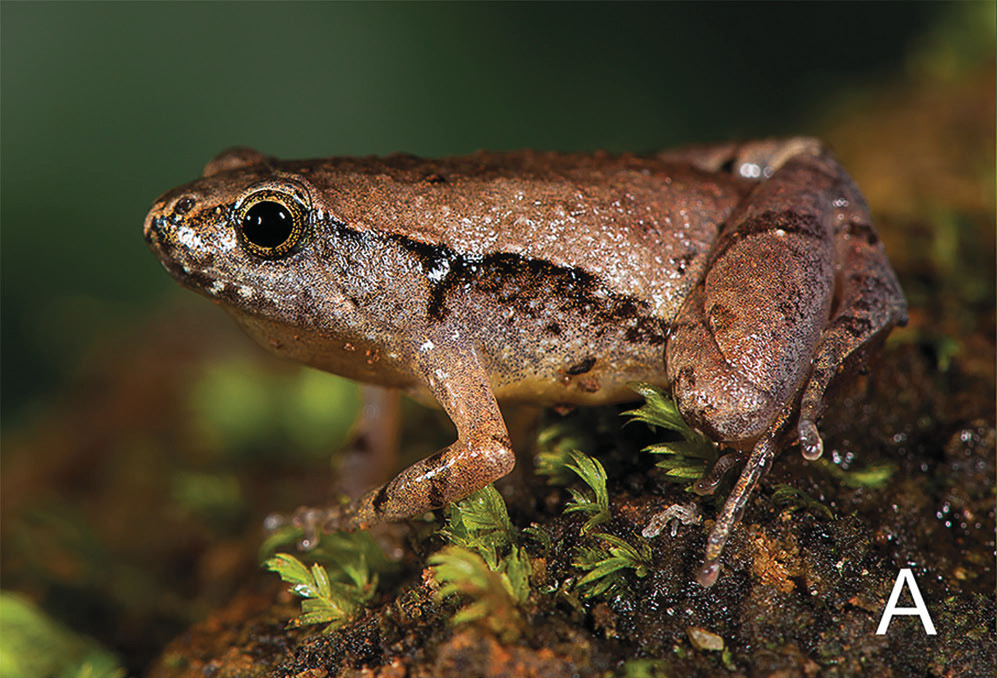
Holotype of Microhyla darreli in lateral view

== Description ==
Adult males measure 15–15.7 mm (0.59–0.62 in) in snout–vent length; no females were collected. The overall appearance is relatively slender. The snout is subovoid in dorsal view and rounded in lateral view. The tympanum is indistinct and the supratympanic fold is weakly developed. The limbs are short. The finger tips are slightly expanded but lack grooves; dermal fringes are weakly developed and webbing is absent. The toe tips are rounded and slightly enlarged into discs with prominent dorsoterminal grooves; dermal fringes are well developed. The dorsum, upper eyelids, and lateral surfaces of snout are greyish-brown with scattered light brown markings dorsum and snout. The lateral surfaces of head are light greyish-brown and bear minute light brown spots. There are prominent brown crossbands on the lips. The sides of the body are greyish-brown with a dark blackish-brown band, marking, or skin fold starting from tip of the nostril and running towards the groin. The limbs are light greyish-brown with brown transverse bands; webbing light brown. The anterior parts of thighs are light yellowish-brown with faint grey spots. The throat is light flesh color with minute dark speckles. The belly is white. The forearms and forelegs have light flesh red color, mottled with dark brown on the margins. Males have a single median vocal sac.

== Habitat and conservation ==
Microhyla darreli has been found inside a wayside plantation area close to a river (the type locality, 21 m (69 ft) asl) and adjacent to a temporary pool inside a plantation. It was observed to be locally abundant during its short breeding season in June–July. As of early 2021, this species has not yet been included in the IUCN Red List of Threatened Species.
