= Microhyla mantheyi =

Conservation status
- Least Concern (IUCN 3.1)

Scientific classification
- Kingdom: Animalia
- Phylum: Chordata
- Class: Amphibia
- Order: Anura
- Family: Microhylidae
- Genus: Microhyla
- Species: M. mantheyi

Binomial name
- Microhyla mantheyi Das, Yaakob and Sukumaran, 2007

Species of amphibian

Microhyla mantheyi (common name: Manthey's narrow-mouthed frog) is a species of microhylid frog. It is endemic to the Malay Peninsula and occurs in southern Myanmar, southern Thailand, Peninsular Malaysia, and Singapore. However, molecular data suggest that the nominal species consists of at least two cryptic species.

Microhyla mantheyi inhabits lowland forests and slightly disturbed areas where they are usually found on the ground or in low vegetation.
