= Microhyla taraiensis =

Scientific classification
- Domain: Eukaryota
- Kingdom: Animalia
- Phylum: Chordata
- Class: Amphibia
- Order: Anura
- Family: Microhylidae
- Genus: Microhyla
- Species: M. taraiensis

Binomial name
- Microhyla taraiensis Khatiwada et al., 2017

Species of amphibian

Microphyla taraiensis is a species of narrow-mouthed frog from eastern Nepal. It is currently known only from its type locality in Jamun Khadi, Jhapa District, eastern Nepal. The specific name taraiensis is derived from the noun "Tarai". It is referring to the flat southern plains of Nepal, the area of the type locality. Common name Tarai narrow-mouthed frog has been suggested for it.

== Description ==
The type series consists of two adult males and an adult female. The males measure 20.0 and 20.3 mm (0.79 and 0.80 in) and the female 24.1 mm (0.95 in) in snout–vent length. The head is relatively broad and snout is rounded. The tympanum is hidden and supratympanic fold is indistinct. The fingers have no webbing whereas the toes have weak webbing. The dorsum is light brown and bears small red spots present all over the dorsal surface of the body and the limbs except for the hand, meta-tarsus and foot. There is a rectangular black marking in the interorbital region and two long black stripes running from the orbital region to the groin. The limbs have some irregular dark bands. The throat is brown in the female but blackish gray in males. The belly is creamy white. The iris is golden yellow.

The male advertisement call sounds like "karr…karr…karr…". Most males were found by their loud calls.

== Habitat and conservation ==
The type locality is an artificial wetland at 119 m (390 ft) above sea level, surrounded by rice plantations. There are some scattered sal trees (Shorea robusta). The specimens were collected from fallow land, near a rice plantation.

Microphyla taraiensis has not been assessed by the International Union for Conservation of Nature (IUCN), but Khatiwada and colleagues suggest that it should be classified as "data deficient". Potential threats include conversion of agricultural lands to settlements, intensification of agriculture, and pesticides.

Microphyla taraiensis is only known from Jamun Khadi, Jhapa District, eastern Nepal
