= Pygmy tree frog =

Pygmy tree frog may refer to:

- Annandale's pygmy tree frog (Chiromantis simus), a frog in the family Rhacophoridae found in Bangladesh and northeastern India (Assam, Mizoram, and West Bengal states)
- Geelvink pygmy tree frog (Litoria pygmaea), a frog in the family Hylidae found in West Papua (Indonesia) and Papua New Guinea
- Nongkhor pygmy tree frog (Chiromantis nongkhorensis), a frog in the family Rhacophoridae found in northeastern India (Assam), Myanmar, Thailand, Cambodia, Laos, Vietnam, and Malaysia
- Sharp-snout pygmy tree frog (Pseudophilautus nasutus), an extinct frog in the family Rhacophoridae that was endemic to Sri Lanka and possibly India
