= Microhyla fusca =

Conservation status
- Data Deficient (IUCN 3.1)

Scientific classification
- Kingdom: Animalia
- Phylum: Chordata
- Class: Amphibia
- Order: Anura
- Family: Microhylidae
- Genus: Microhyla
- Species: M. fusca

Binomial name
- Microhyla fusca Andersson, 1942

Species of amphibian

Microhyla fusca (common names: brown rice frog or Dalat pigmy frog) is a species of frog in the family Microhylidae. It is endemic to Vietnam: it is only known from its type locality, Da Lat on Lang Biang Plateau in southern Vietnam. Its natural habitats are swamps, freshwater marshes, and intermittent freshwater marshes. Its status is insufficiently known.
