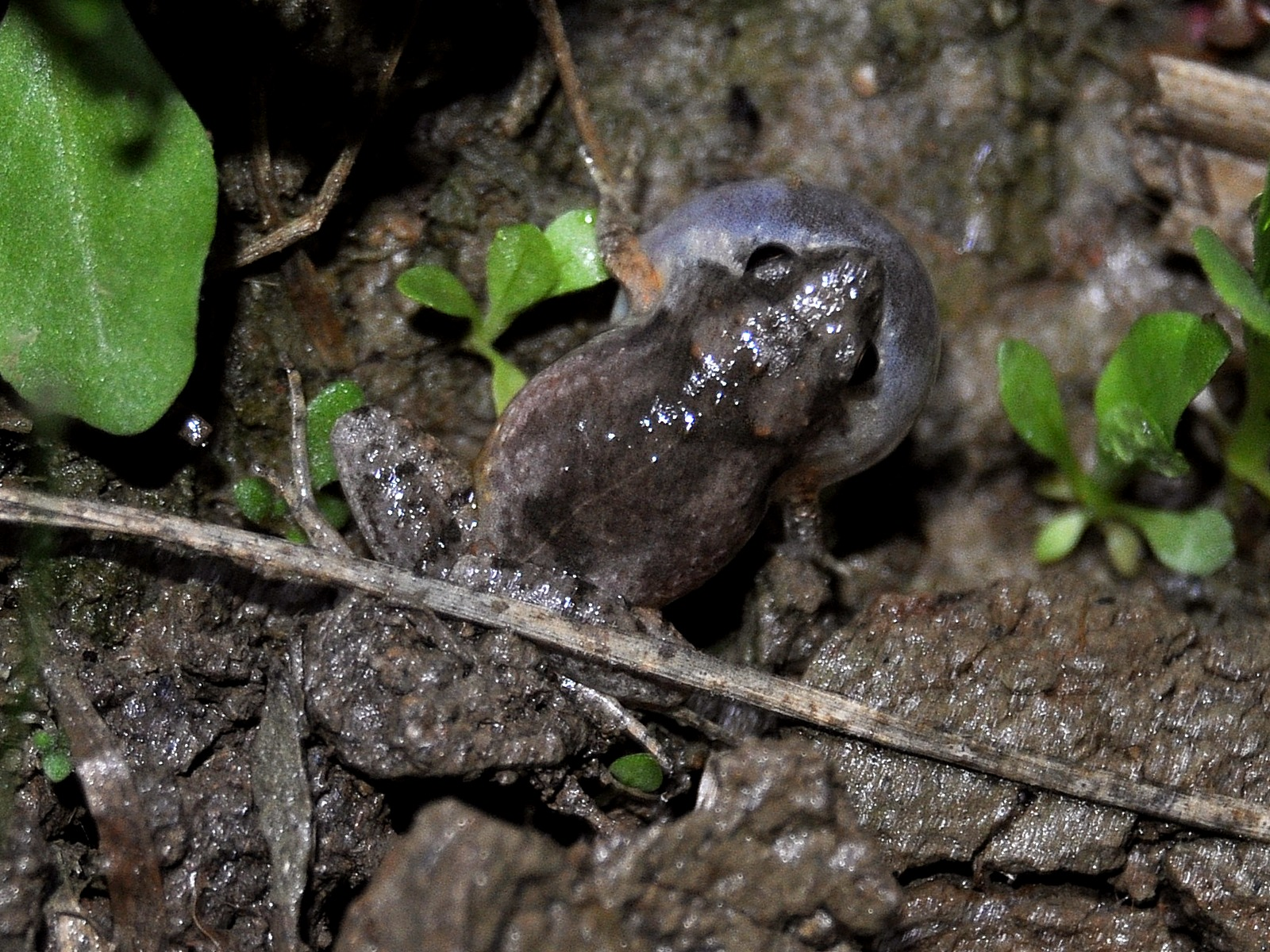
- Microhyla palmipes, male, from Karawang, West Java, Indonesia

Conservation status
- Least Concern (IUCN 3.1)

Scientific classification
- Kingdom: Animalia
- Phylum: Chordata
- Class: Amphibia
- Order: Anura
- Family: Microhylidae
- Genus: Microhyla
- Species: M. palmipes

Binomial name
- Microhyla palmipes Boulenger, 1897

= Palmated chorus frog =

Species of amphibian

The palmated chorus frog (Microhyla palmipes) is a species of frog in the family Microhylidae. It is found in Indonesia and Malaysia. Its natural habitats are subtropical or tropical moist lowland forests, rivers, and freshwater marshes. It is not considered threatened by the IUCN.

== Description ==
The palmated chorus frog is a very small species measuring about 18 mm (0.7 in) from in snout–vent length. It has a relatively small head with a rounded tubercle on its upper eyelid but apart from this its skin is smooth. Its digits have slightly enlarged tips and are partially webbed. The dorsal surface of this frog is pale greyish-brown with a central double arrowhead pattern of darker brown and dark, blackish sides. The tadpole is black with transparent fins on its tail which has a pointed end. Its eyes are located on the sides of its head and the spiracle is central and sheathed with a flap of skin. no

== Distribution and habitat ==
This frog is known from several widely separated locations in Malaysia. These include the Batu Caves, the Taman Negara National Park, and the Sekayu waterfalls in Trengganu-Berry. It is also found in Sumatra, Nias, Java, Madura and Bali. Its distribution within Indonesia is fragmented. Its habitat is among grasses in marshy land at altitudes of up to 1,500 metres (4,900 ft) and in forests and forest fringes. It breeds in slow-flowing streams and stagnant water.

== Status ==
This frog has a wide range and although the population seems to be declining, the IUCN rates it as being of "Least Concern" as it considers that the rate of decline is insufficient to justify listing it in a more threatened category. It is common in some parts of its range but is inconspicuous because of its small size and no particular threats to this species have been identified apart from some degradation of its forest habitat.
