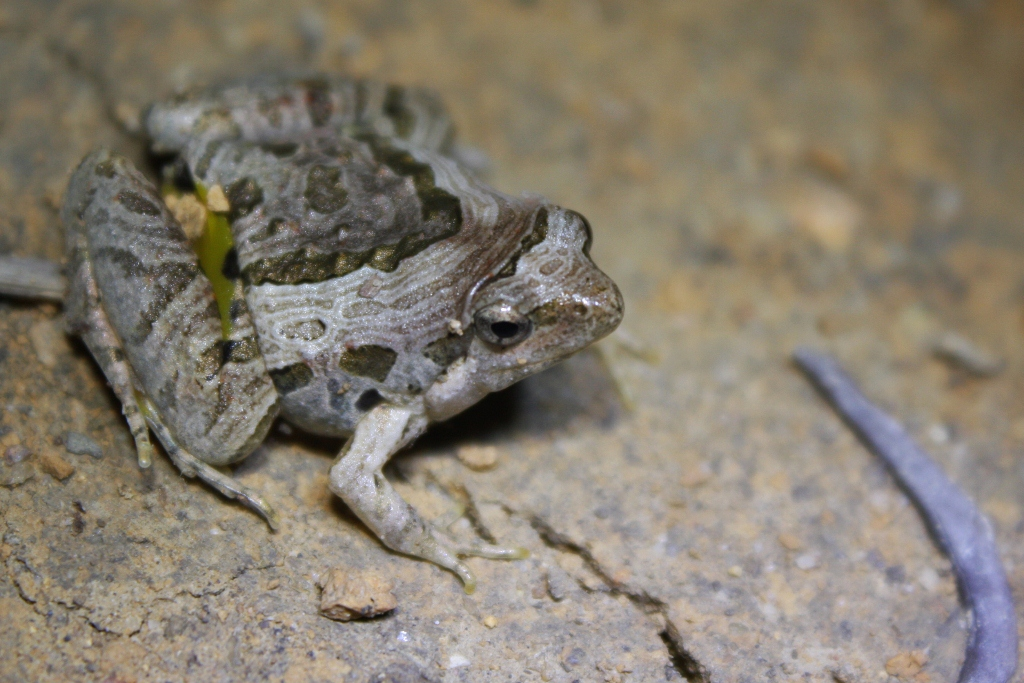

Conservation status
- Least Concern (IUCN 3.1)

Scientific classification
- Kingdom: Animalia
- Phylum: Chordata
- Class: Amphibia
- Order: Anura
- Family: Microhylidae
- Genus: Microhyla
- Species: M. pulchra

Binomial name
- Microhyla pulchra (Hallowell, 1861)

Synonyms
- Engystoma pulchrum Hallowell, 1861; Microhyla hainanensis Barbour, 1908; Microhyla melli Vogt, 1914; Microhyla major Ahl, 1930 Ranina symmetrica David, 1872 Scaptophyrne labyrinthica Fitzinger, 1861

= Microhyla pulchra =

Species of amphibian

Microhyla pulchra is a species of narrow-mouthed frog found in northeastern India, southern China, and Southeast Asia south to at least Thailand but possibly as far south as Malaysia and Singapore. It has also been introduced to Guam.

It has many common names, including beautiful pygmy frog, Guangdong rice frog, and marbled pygmy frog. Microhyla pulchra is a common species in suitable habitat, but it is not often seen because it is cryptic and seasonal. It typically occurs near forest edges. It is eaten in Laos.
