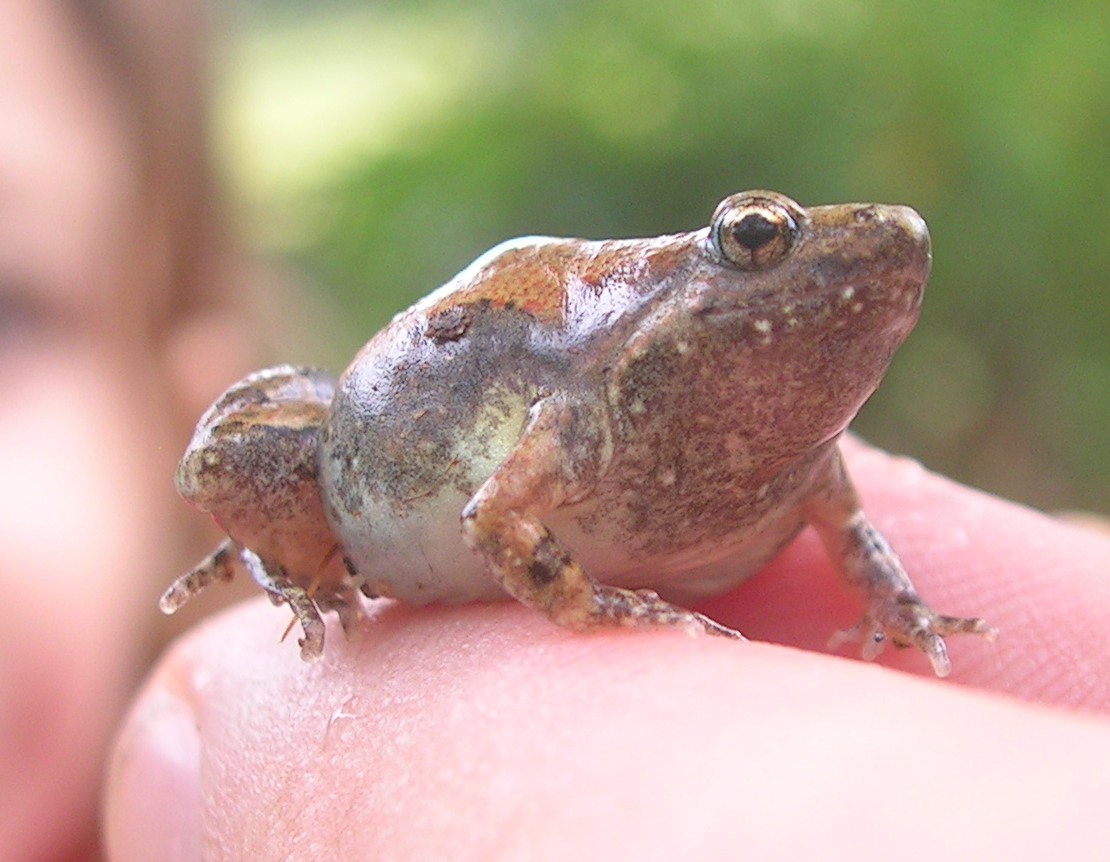

Conservation status
- Least Concern (IUCN 3.1)

Scientific classification
- Kingdom: Animalia
- Phylum: Chordata
- Class: Amphibia
- Order: Anura
- Family: Microhylidae
- Genus: Microhyla
- Species: M. ornata

Binomial name
- Microhyla ornata (Duméril and Bibron, 1841)

= Microhyla ornata =

Ornate narrow-mouthed frog

Species of amphibian

Microhyla ornata, commonly known as the ornate narrow-mouthed frog, ornate narrow-mouthed toad, or ornamented pygmy frog, is a species of microhylid frog found in South Asia. This amphibian is distributed in Kashmir, Nepal, peninsular India and the Andaman and Nicobar Islands, Sri Lanka, and Bangladesh. It was previously considered to be the same species as Microhyla fissipes; therefore, the aforementioned common names can refer to either species.

== Description ==
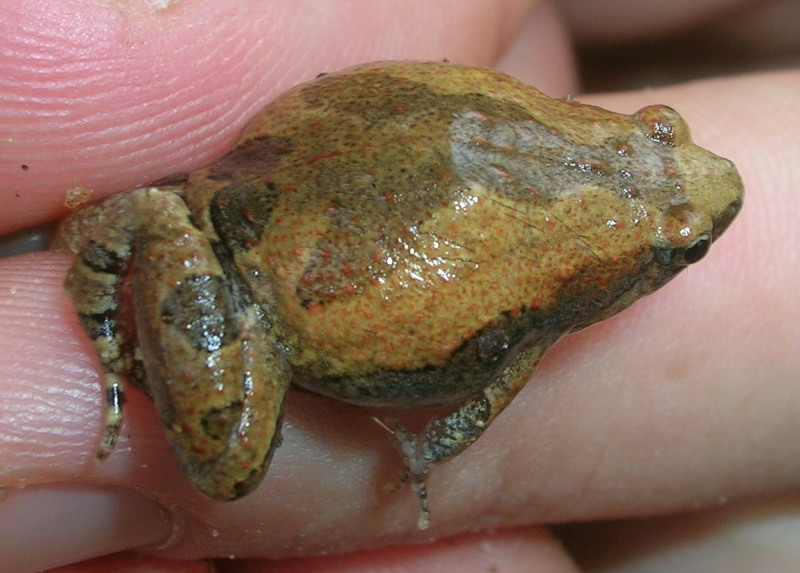
Specimen seen at Jalpaiguri(Berubari) Palash Ball

Frogs of the genus Microhyla are small. They can be identified by the typical arrow-shaped mark on their dorsal side. They are generally of yellowish color with dark brown patch. This species has a small head, no teeth and no discernible tympani. The fingertips are spathulate and there is little webbing between the digits. The males do not have nuptial pads. The skin on the back is mainly smooth, but there are some granulations. Males are about 24 mm (0.9 in) from snout to vent and females about 28 mm (1.1 in).

== Distribution and habitat ==
The ornate narrow-mouthed frog is native to Bangladesh, Bhutan, India, Nepal, Pakistan and Sri Lanka. It is found in grass and leaf litter in habitats ranging from tropical and subtropical grasslands, savannas, and shrublands to tropical and subtropical moist broadleaf forests, tropical and subtropical dry broadleaf forests and tropical and subtropical coniferous forests.

In some habitats, this frog may take shelter in the dung of elephants.

== Biology ==
The ornate narrow-mouthed frog lives semi-buried in leaf litter on the forest floor. It is mainly nocturnal but it is also active during the day during the rainy season. It breeds in ponds and temporary pools that form in the rainy season.

== Status ==
This frog has a wide range and the population seems to be stable so the IUCN rates it as being of "Least Concern" as it considers that the rate of decline, if any, is insufficient to justify listing it in a more threatened category. It is common throughout most of its range and is tolerant of a range of different habitat types. No particular threats to this species have been identified.
