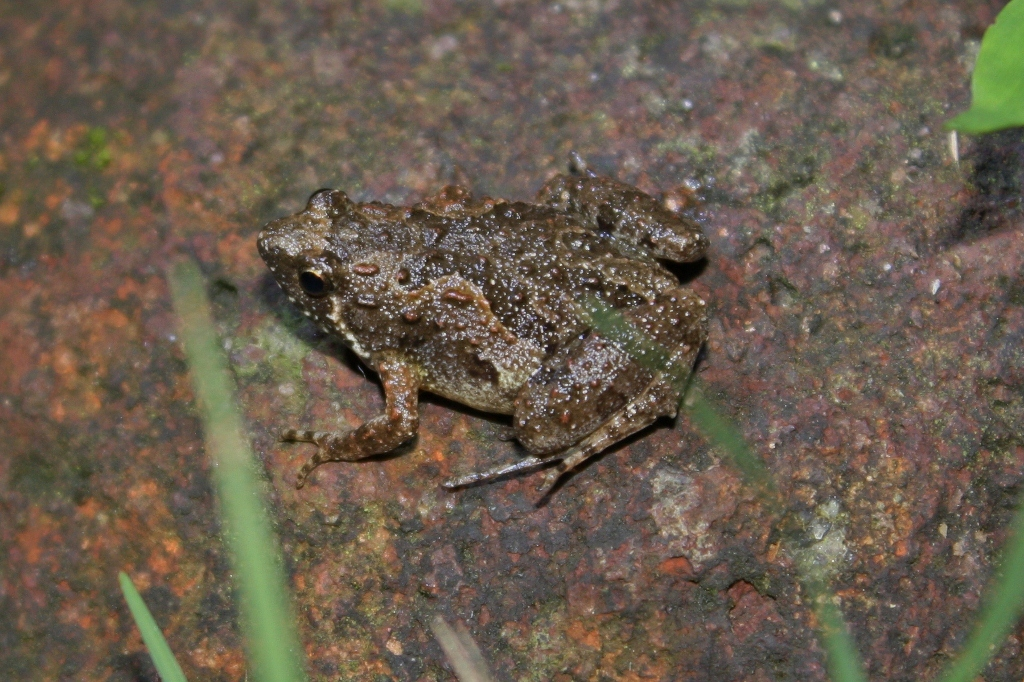

Conservation status
- Least Concern (IUCN 3.1)

Scientific classification
- Kingdom: Animalia
- Phylum: Chordata
- Class: Amphibia
- Order: Anura
- Family: Microhylidae
- Genus: Microhyla
- Species: M. butleri

Binomial name
- Microhyla butleri Boulenger, 1900

Synonyms
- Microhyla boulengeri Vogt, 1913; Microhyla latastii Boulenger, 1920; Microhyla grahami Stejneger, 1924; Microhyla sowerbyi Stejneger, 1924; Microhyla cantonensis Chen, 1929

= Painted chorus frog =

Species of amphibian

The painted chorus frog (Microhyla butleri), also commonly known as Butler's narrow-mouthed toad, Butler's pigmy frog, Butler's rice frog, Butler's ricefrog, noisy frog or tubercled pygmy frog, is a species of frog in the family Microhylidae. It is found in northeast India, Myanmar, southern China, Hong Kong, Taiwan, Thailand, Cambodia, Laos, Vietnam, Peninsular Malaysia, and Singapore. Its natural habitats are subtropical or tropical moist lowland forest, subtropical or tropical moist montane forest, subtropical or tropical moist shrubland, swamps, intermittent freshwater marshes, arable land, plantations, rural gardens, ponds, open excavations, and irrigated land. It is not considered threatened by the IUCN.

Microhyla butleri have skin that is smooth or with small smooth warts above. They are brownish on their back, pale reddish on the sides and limbs, and whitish beneath. Male Microhyla butleri grow to a snout-vent length of 21–23 mm (0.83–0.91 in) and females to 23–26 mm (0.91–1.02 in).

== Presence in Singapore ==
Microhyla butleri has recently been added to the 'Bukit Timah Nature Reserve (BTNR) checklist in 2019.

== Gallery ==
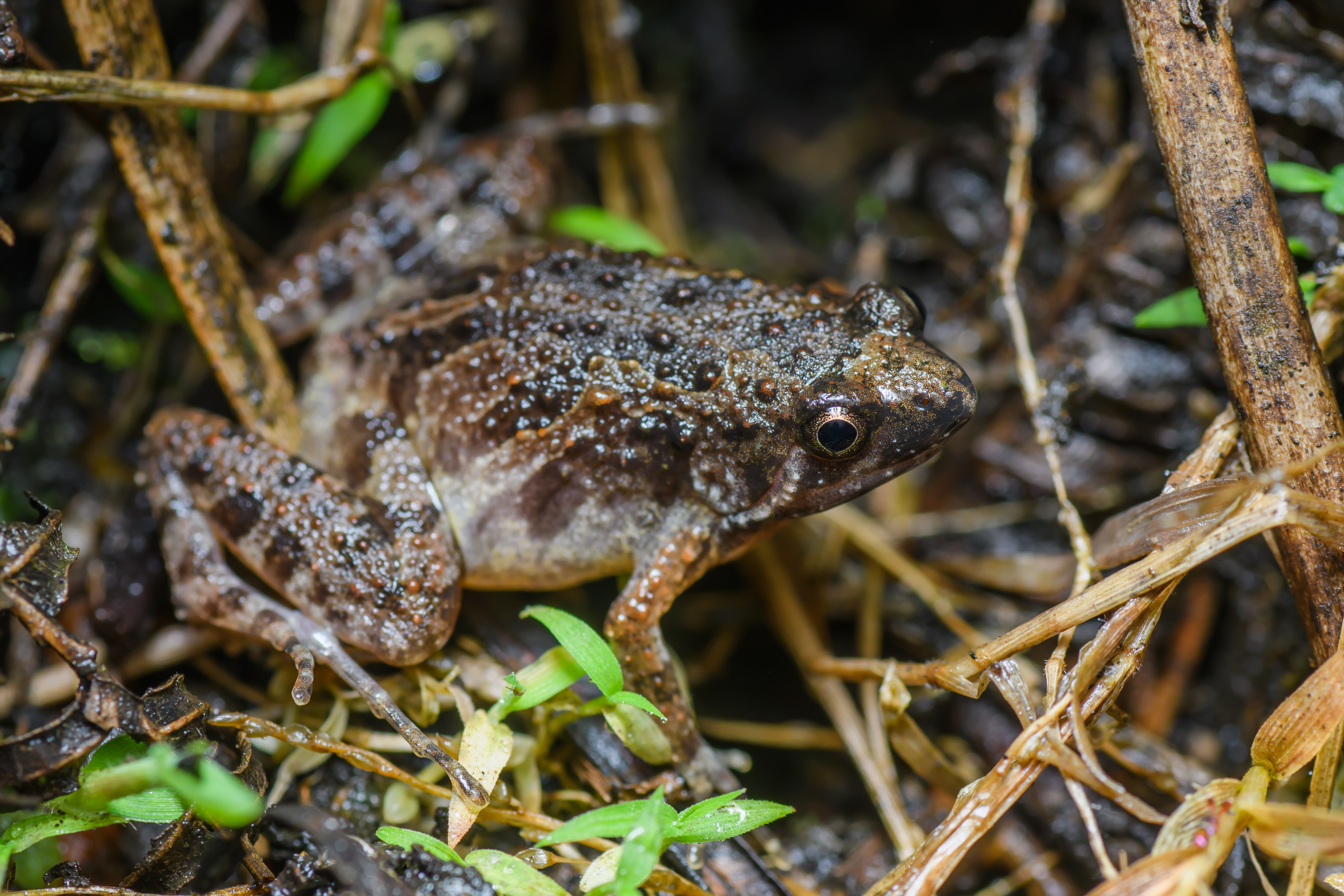
Microhyla butleri, Noisy chorus frog - Phu Kradueng National Park
