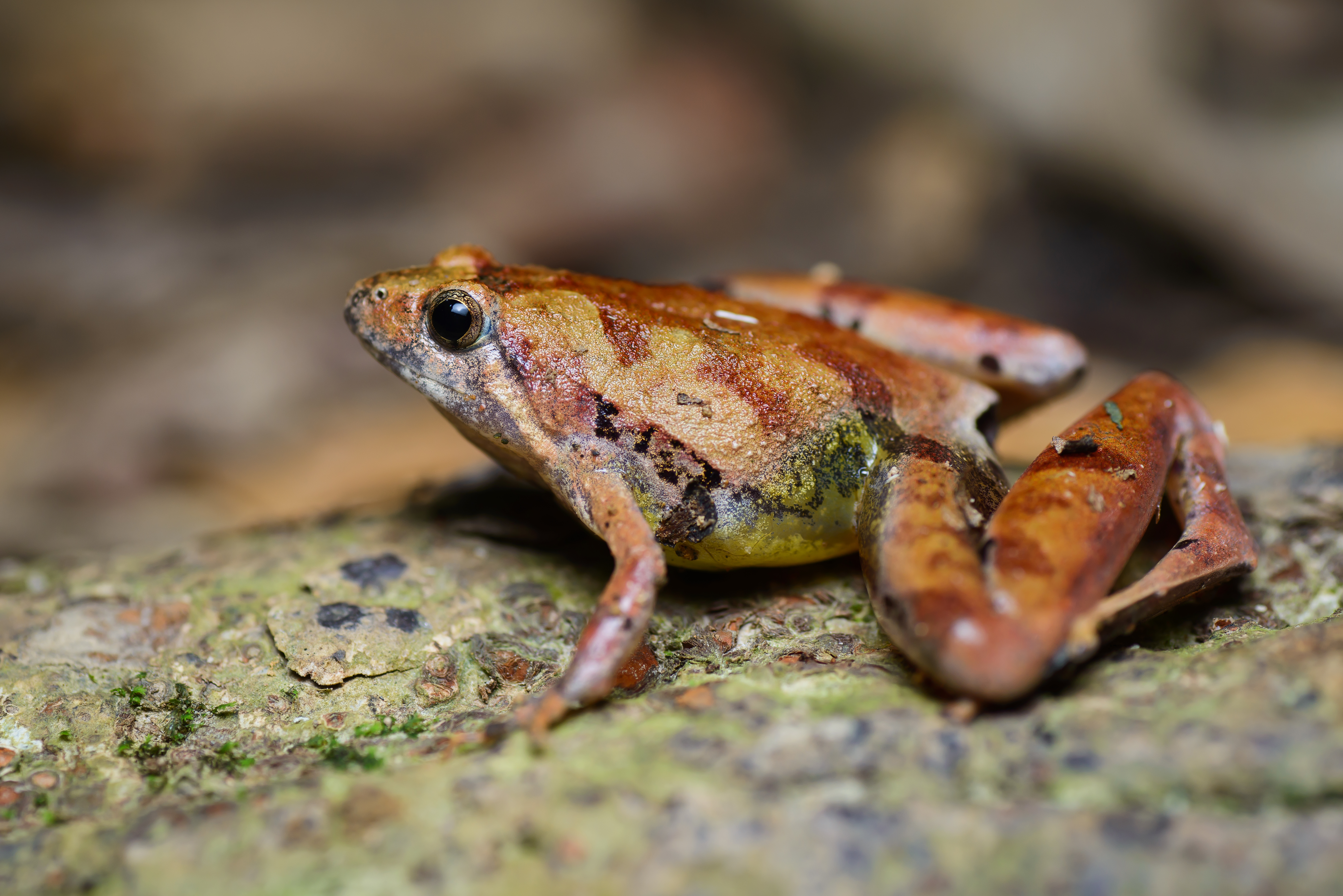
- Microhyla berdmorei, Khao Luang National Park

Conservation status
- Least Concern (IUCN 3.1)

Scientific classification
- Kingdom: Animalia
- Phylum: Chordata
- Class: Amphibia
- Order: Anura
- Family: Microhylidae
- Genus: Microhyla
- Species: M. berdmorei

Binomial name
- Microhyla berdmorei (Blyth, 1856)

= Microhyla berdmorei =

Species of amphibian

Microhyla berdmorei, commonly known as Berdmore's chorus frog, Berdmore's narrow-mouthed frog, Burmese microhylid frog, large pygmy frog, and Pegu rice frog, is a species of narrow-mouthed frog found in eastern India, Bangladesh, southernmost China (Yunnan), Mainland Southeast Asia as well as Borneo and Sumatra. Frogs from Bangladesh probably represent an unnamed species.

== Description ==
Male Microhyla berdmorei grow to a snout–vent length of 25–28 mm (0.98–1.10 in) and females to 27–45 mm (1.1–1.8 in). They have a characteristic yellowish belly. They have relatively long legs and can make impressive jumps. Tadpoles are up to 23 mm (0.91 in) in length.

== Habitat ==
Microhyla berdmorei inhabits various types of moist evergreen forest. It is generally associated with hilly regions and often found near streams. Breeding mainly takes place in still pools. Male frogs form large choruses. It is a common species in suitable habitat (though not in Borneo).

== Gallery ==
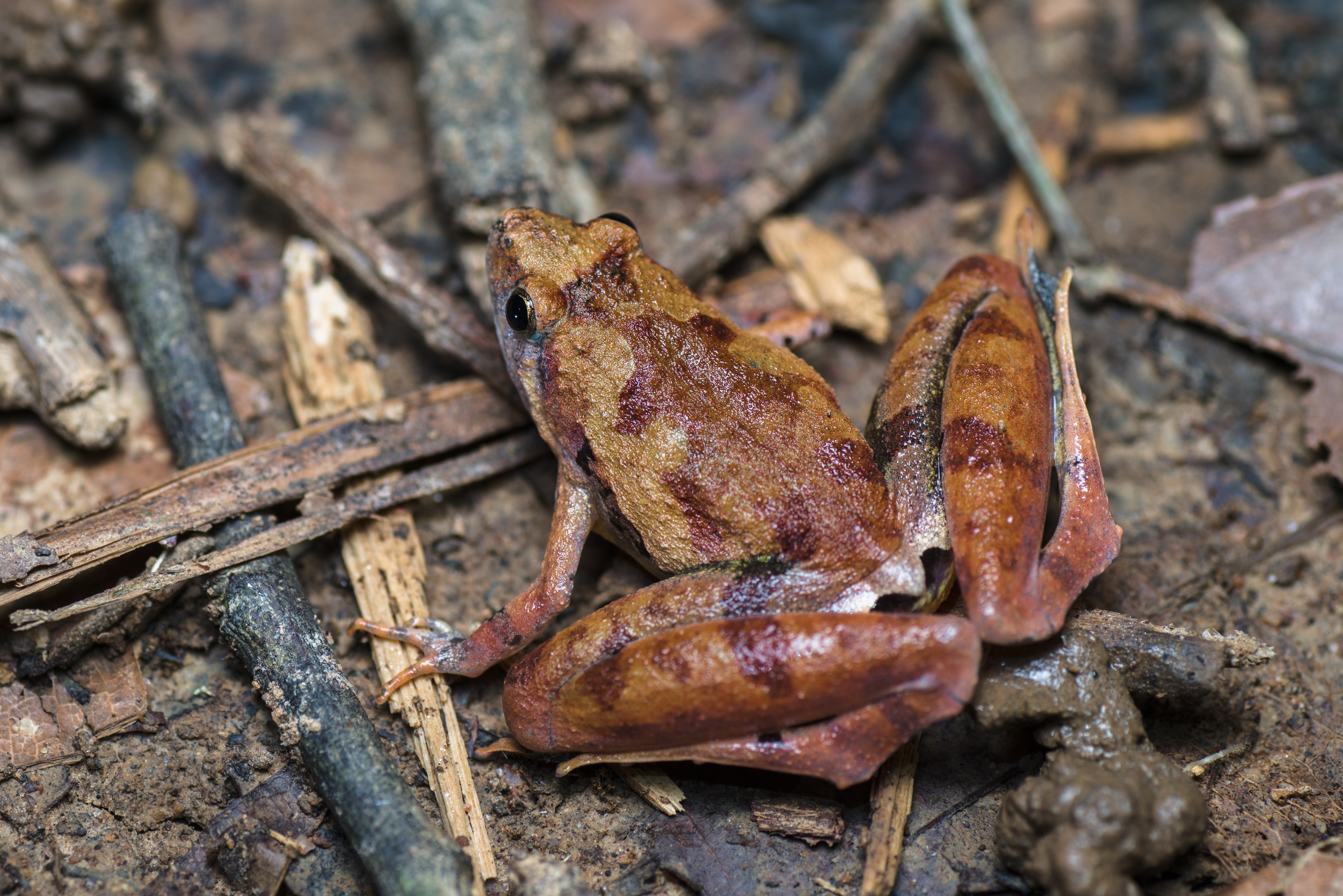
Microhyla berdmorei, Khao Luang National Park

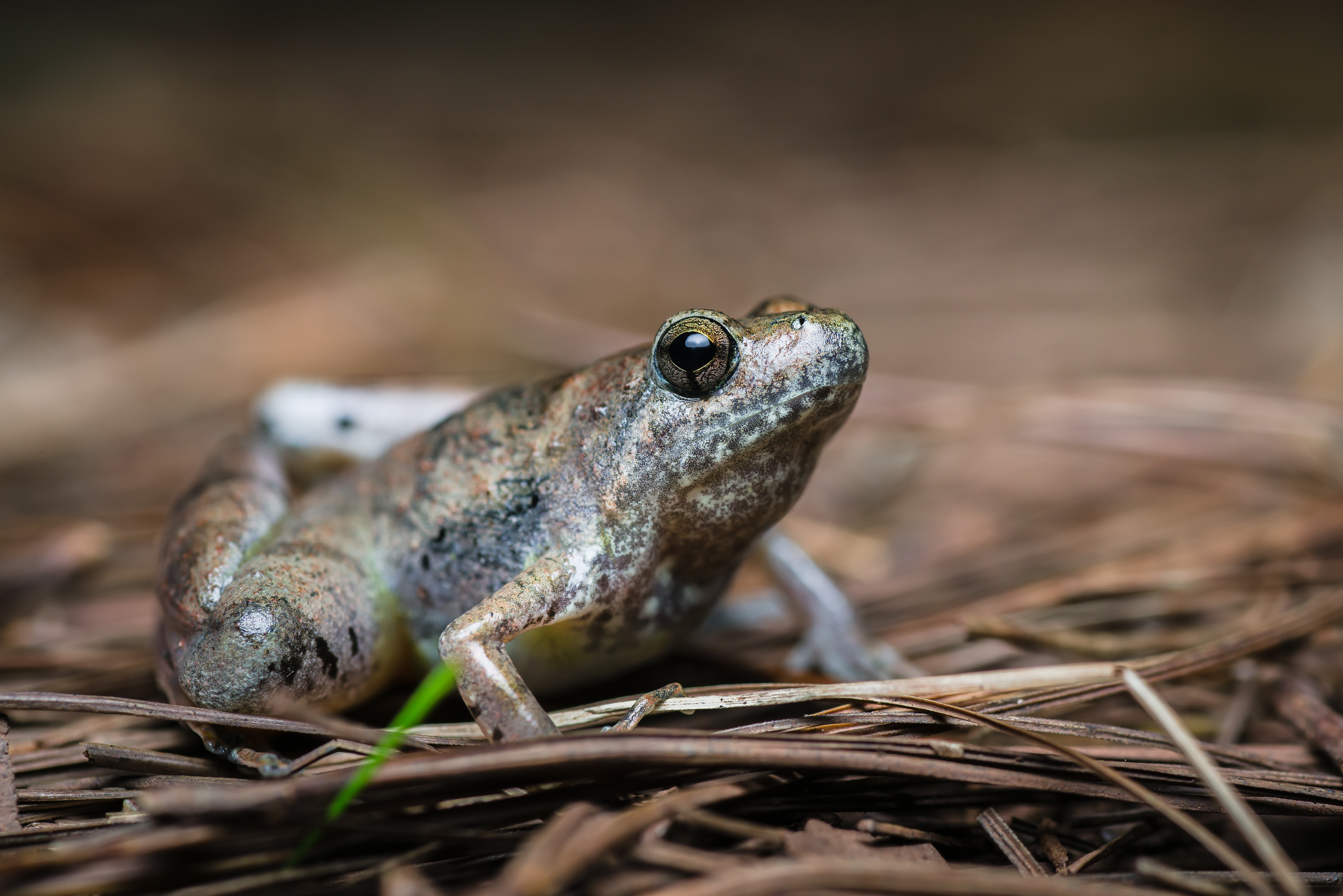
Microhyla berdmorei, Nam Nao National Park

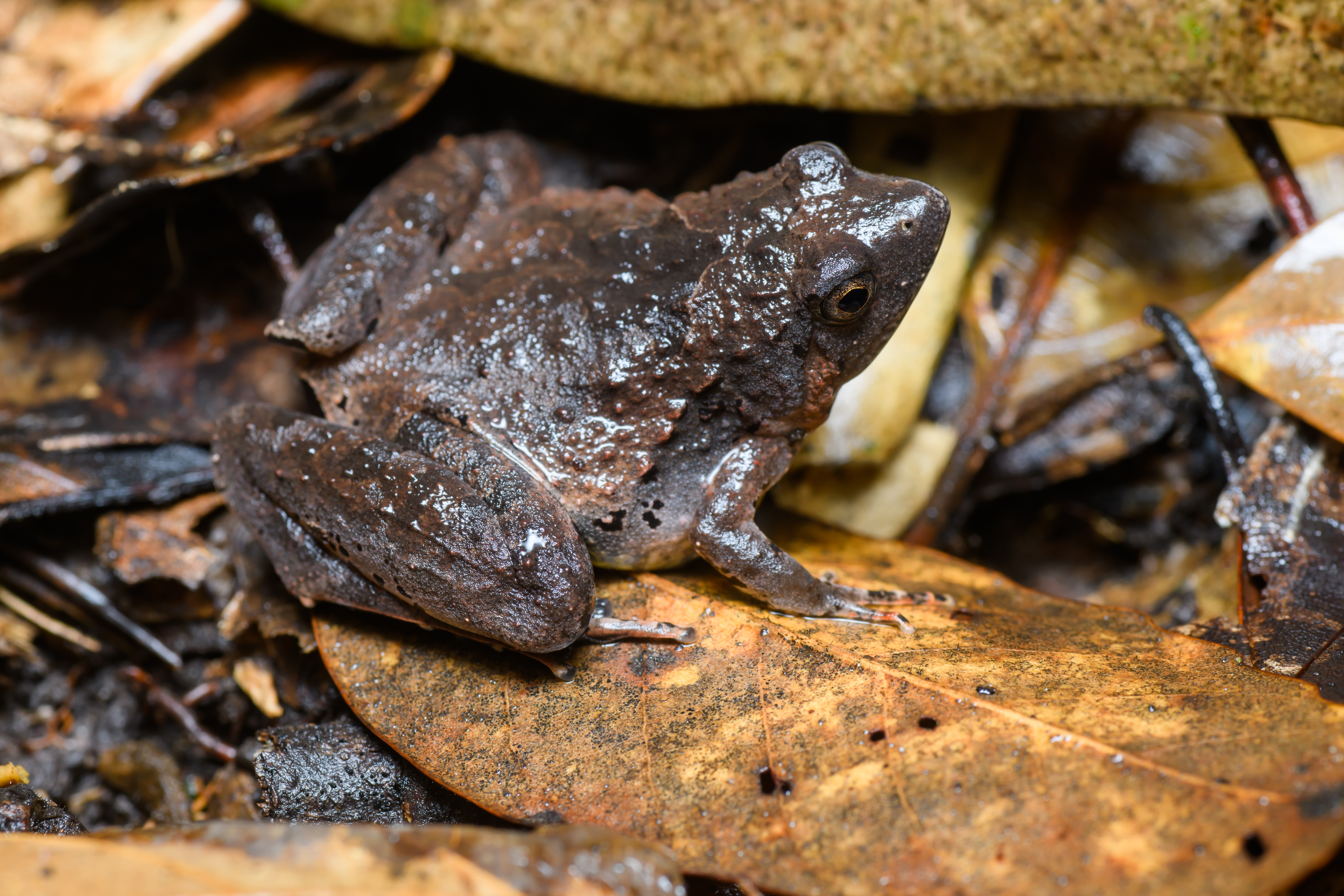
Microhyla berdmorei - Phu Kradueng National Park

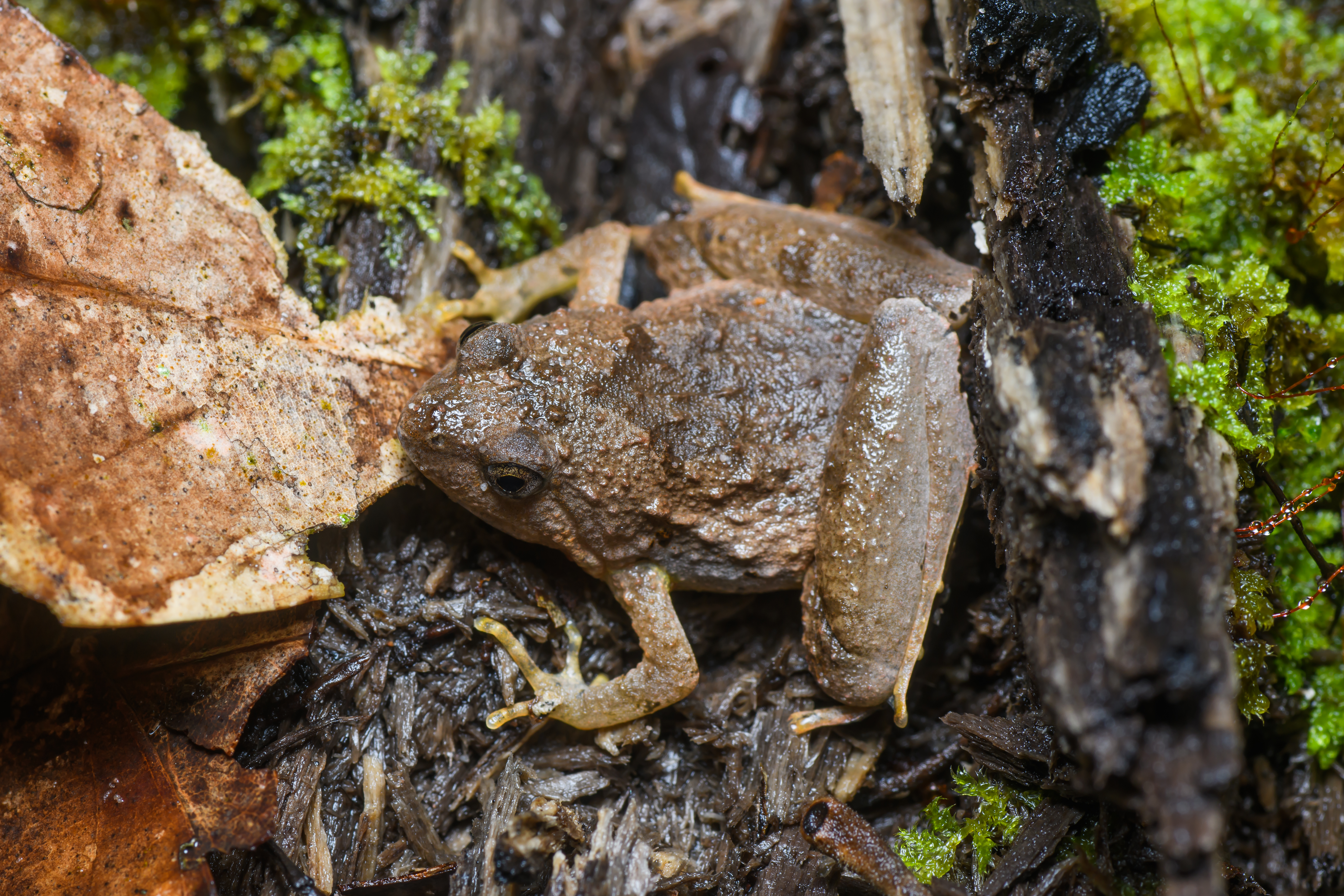
Microhyla berdmorei - Phu Kradueng National Park
