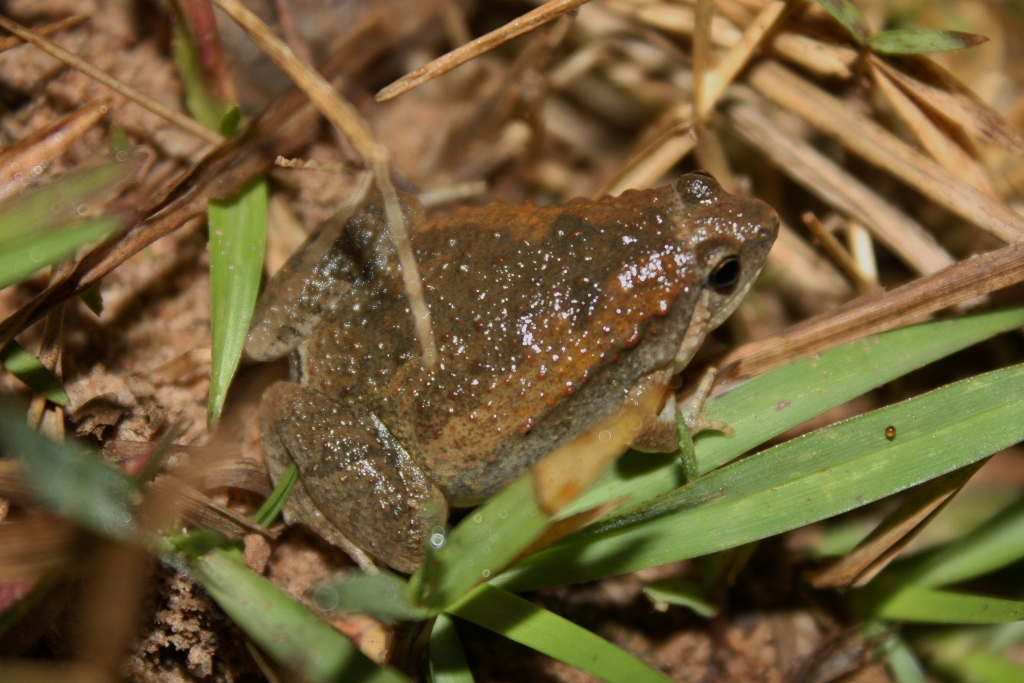
- Adult

Conservation status
- Least Concern (IUCN 3.1)

Scientific classification
- Kingdom: Animalia
- Phylum: Chordata
- Class: Amphibia
- Order: Anura
- Family: Microhylidae
- Genus: Microhyla
- Species: M. fissipes

Binomial name
- Microhyla fissipes Boulenger, 1884
- Distribution (red)

Synonyms
- Microhyla eremita Barbour, 1920

= Microhyla fissipes =

Species of amphibian

Microhyla fissipes (commonly known as the ornate chorus frog) is a microhylid frog from East and Southeast Asia, from southern and central China and Taiwan to the Malay Peninsula. It was previously considered to be the same species as Microhyla ornata of South Asia; thus the common names ornate narrow-mouthed frog or ornamented pygmy frog can refer to either species.

== Description ==
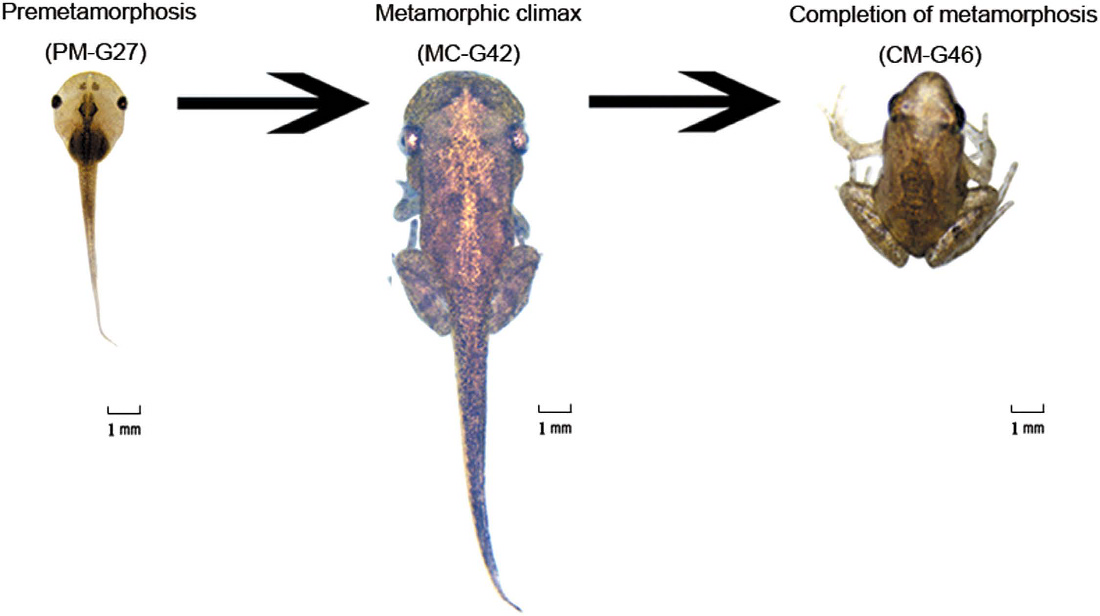
Developmental stages

As microhylids in general, Microhyla fissipes is a small frog: males reach 22–27 mm (0.87–1.06 in) and females 25–28 mm (0.98–1.10 in) in snout-vent length. Tadpoles are correspondingly small, about 22 mm (0.87 in) in total length.

== Habitat and behaviour ==
Microhyla fissipes is a common and widespread species. It can be found in many habitat types including lowland scrub forests, grassland, agricultural land, pastureland and urban areas. Sub-fossorial in habit, it is also found in forest floor leaf-litter. It is mostly nocturnal, only active diurnally during the rainy season. It breeds in rain pools and other bodies of still water. It tolerates habitat modification and can also occur in non-intensively farmed agricultural land. In the Peninsular Malaysia, it inhabits upper hill and montane forest where they can be found on low vegetation or around puddles or waterlogged areas.

== See also ==
- Microhyla letovirus 1 – a phylogenetically distinct species of virus hosted by M. fissipes
