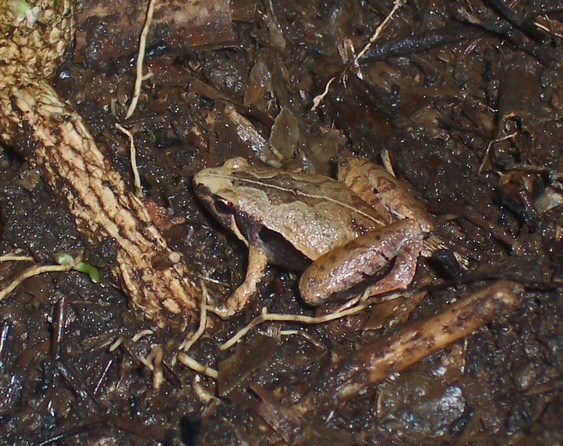
- Microhyla achatina from Bogor, West Java

Conservation status
- Least Concern (IUCN 3.1)

Scientific classification
- Kingdom: Animalia
- Phylum: Chordata
- Class: Amphibia
- Order: Anura
- Family: Microhylidae
- Genus: Microhyla
- Species: M. achatina

Binomial name
- Microhyla achatina Tschudi, 1838

Synonyms
- Hysaplesia achatina Boie in Schlegel, 1826 – nomen nudum; Diplopelma disciferum Peters, 1867

= Microhyla achatina =

Species of amphibian

Microhyla achatina, commonly known as the Javan chorus frog, Java rice frog, or Javanese narrow-mouthed frog, is a species of narrow-mouthed frog endemic to Java, Indonesia.

== Description ==
Microhyla achatina is a small species with a narrow head. Its eyes are small and the feet have partially webbed digits. Males have a snout-to-vent length around 2 cm (0.8 in) and females are a little larger. It is yellowish brown on the dorsal side with two dark stripes, with a symmetric arrow-shaped mark and sometimes a narrow pale line along the spine. The sides are dark.

== Habitat and distribution ==
This is a frog of primary and secondary forest, sometimes found around human developments, such as paddy fields and forest gardens. This species is found at altitudes up to 1,200 metres (3,900 ft) above sea level.

This frog is endemic to Java and is found in the central and western parts of the island.

== Biology ==
The diet of this frog consists of ants, termites and many other tiny insects. It breeds in ponds, permanent pools or marshy areas and the males call at night, several neighboring frogs making a chorus and producing a song that sounds like the sounds made by crickets. The call has a frequency of between 3 and 3.2 kHz, with a pulse rate of 14–20 pulses per second, and a duration of less than a second. Females lay small clutches of about 20 eggs.

== Status ==
This frog has a relatively wide range and the population seems to be stable so the IUCN rates it as being of "Least Concern" as it considers that the rate of decline, if any, is insufficient to justify listing it in a more threatened category. It is to some extent tolerant of forest degradation and no particular threats to this species have been identified.

== Pictures ==
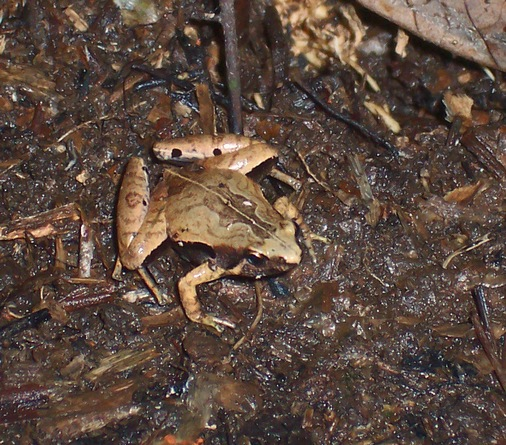
In Darmaga, Bogor

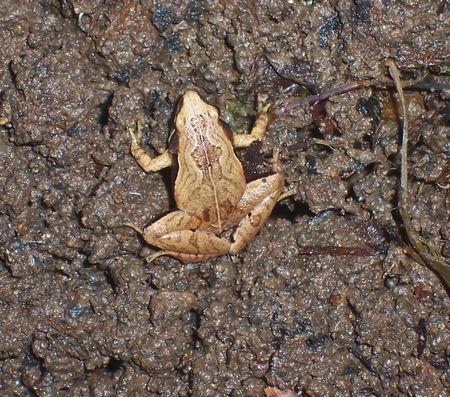

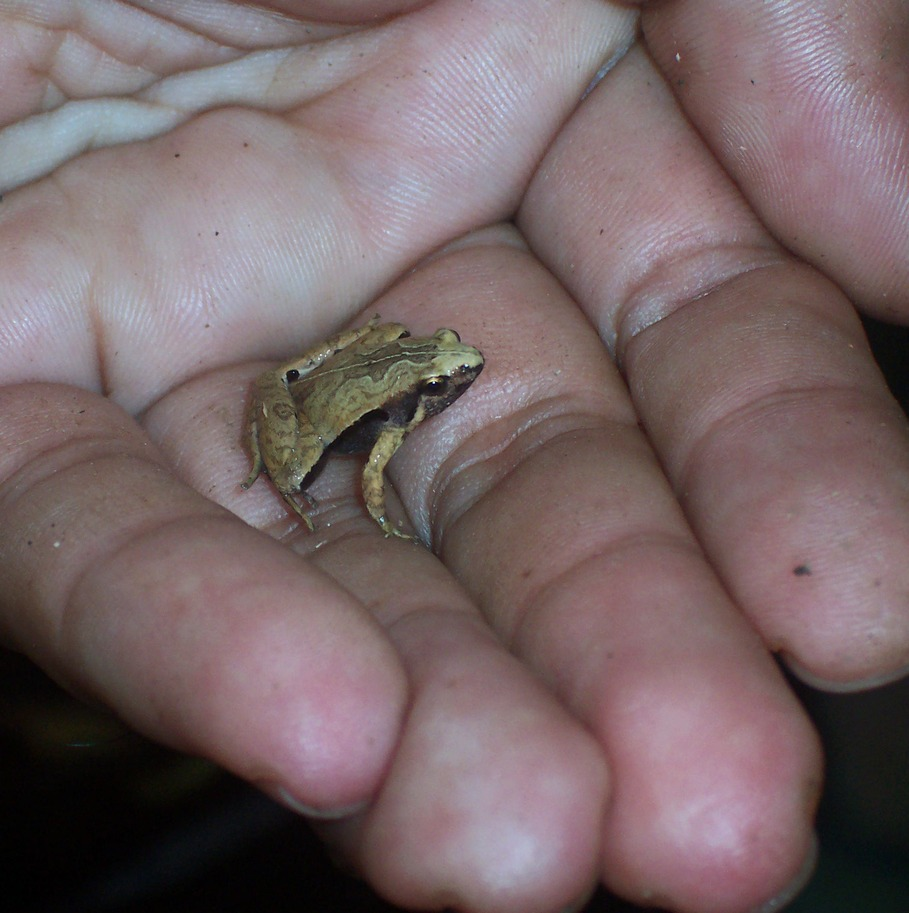

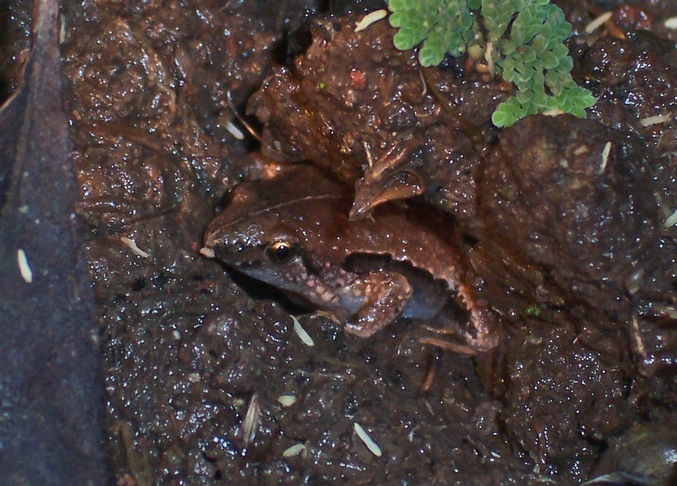
Male at his calling hole, a dried paddyfield in Kuningan
