= List of amphibians of Cambodia =

The amphibians of Cambodia are diverse.

== Species ==
- Chirixalus doriae
- Chirixalus nongkhorensis
- Chirixalus samkosensis
- Duttaphrynus melanostictus
- Feihyla vittata
- Fejervarya cancrivora
- Fejervarya limnocharis
- Fejervarya triora
- Glyphoglossus guttulata
- Glyphoglossus molossus
- Hoplobatrachus rugulosus
- Hylarana erythraea
- Hylarana macrodactyla
- Indosylvirana milleti
- Hylarana taipehensis
- Ichthyophis kohtaoensis
- Ichthyophis sp.
- Ingerophrynus galeatus
- Ingerophrynus macrotis
- Ingerophrynus parvus
- Kalophrynus interlineatus
- Kaloula indochinensis
- Kaloula mediolineata
- Kaloula pulchra
- Kurixalus bisacculus
- Leptobrachium mouhoti
- Leptolalax melicus
- Leptolalax sp. 1
- Leptolalax sp. 2
- Limnonectes kuhlii
- Limnonectes dabanus
- Limnonectes gyldenstolpei
- Limnonectes kohchangae
- Limnonectes limborgi
- Limnonectes poilani
- Limnonectes poilani
- Megophrys auralensis
- Megophrys damrei
- Megophrys lekaguli
- Megophrys major
- Microhyla annamensis
- Microhyla berdmorei
- Microhyla butleri
- Microhyla fissipes
- Microhyla heymonsi
- Microhyla pulchra
- Micryletta inornata
- Occidozyga lima
- Occidozyga martensii
- Odorrana banaorum
- Odorrana morafkai
- Ophryophryne hansi
- Ophryophryne synoria
- Papurana attigua
- Pelophylax lateralis
- Philautus abditus
- Philautus cardamonus
- Raorchestes parvulus
- Polypedates leucomystax
- Quasipaa fasciculispina
- Rana johnsi
- Rhacophorus annamensis
- Rhacophorus rhodopus
- Rhacophorus robertingeri
- Rhacophorus sp.
- Sylvirana faber
- Sylvirana mortenseni
- Sylvirana nigrovittata
- Theloderma asperum
- Theloderma stellatum
- Zhangixalus jarujini
- Zhangixalus smaragdinus

== Consumption ==
Species collected for human consumption are Hoplobatrachus rugulosus, Fejervarya limnocharis, Glyphoglossus molossus, pulchra, Duttaphrynus melanostictus, and Pelophylax lateralis (with P. lateralis found only north of the Mekong river in localities such as Snuol district, Kratié province). Kaloula mediolineata is also likely consumed in northern Cambodia. Glyphoglossus molossus is the species most vulnerable to harvesting activities, while wild populations of Hoplobatrachus rugulosus are also declining due to intensive harvesting.
