= Narrowmouth toad (disambiguation) =

The narrowmouth toad is a genus of microhylid frogs found in the Americas between Honduras and the southern United States.

Narrowmouth toad may also refer to:

- Assam narrowmouth toad, a frog found in northeastern India
- Bicol narrowmouth toad, a frog endemic to the Philippines
- Kalinga narrowmouth toad, a frog endemic to the Philippines
- Painted narrowmouth toad, a frog endemic to the Philippines
- Philippine narrowmouth toad, a frog endemic to the Philippines

== See also ==
- Narrow-mouthed toad (disambiguation)
