= Digging frog =

Digging frog may refer to:

- Boreal digging frog (Kaloula borealis), a frog in the family Microhylidae found in Northeast Asia
- Sichuan digging frog (Kaloula rugifera), a frog in the family Microhylidae endemic to China, where it is found in Sichuan and extreme southern Gansu
- Verrucous digging frog (Kaloula verrucosa), a frog in the family Microhylidae known only from the Yunnan–Guizhou Plateau of southwestern China in Sichuan, Yunnan, and Guizhou provinces, but expected to occur in adjacent Myanmar, Laos, and Vietnam

== See also ==
- Digging (disambiguation)
- Frog (disambiguation)
