= Balloon frog (disambiguation) =

The balloon frogs are a small genus of microhylid frogs from South Asia.

Balloon frog may also refer to:

- Assamese balloon frog, a frog found in northeastern India
- Glyphoglossus molossus, a frog found in Cambodia, Laos, Myanmar, Thailand, and Vietnam
