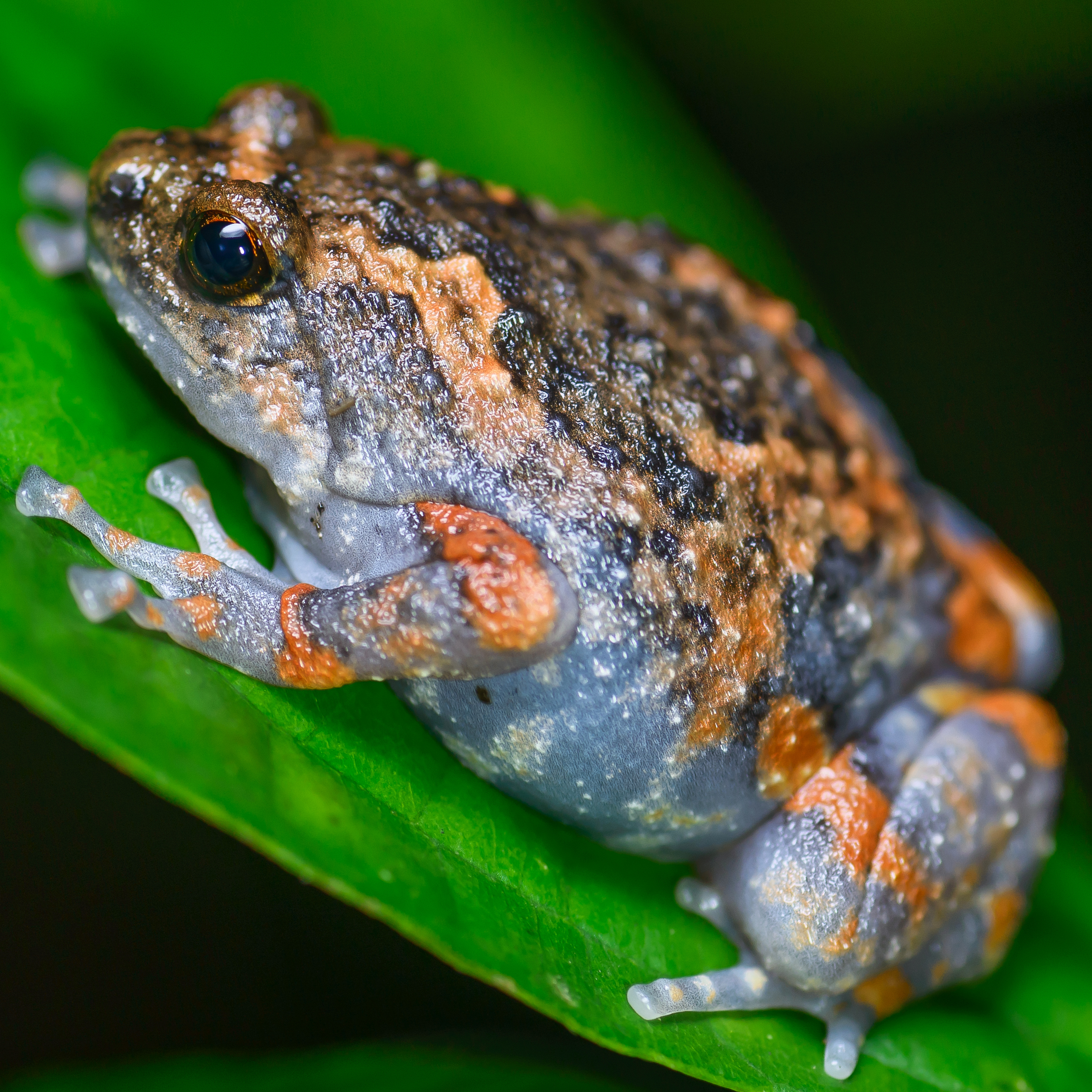

Conservation status
- Data Deficient (IUCN 3.1)

Scientific classification
- Kingdom: Animalia
- Phylum: Chordata
- Class: Amphibia
- Order: Anura
- Family: Microhylidae
- Genus: Kaloula
- Species: K. latidisca

Binomial name
- Kaloula latidisca Chan, Grismer, and Brown, 2014

= Kaloula latidisca =

Species of amphibian

Kaloula latidisca, also known as wide-disked narrow-mouthed frog, wide-disked painted frog, wide-disked bullfrog, Malaya painted bullfrog, Malayan painted bullfrog, and Malay painted sticky frog, is a species of frogs in the family Microhylidae. It is endemic to the Malay Peninsula and occurs in southern Myanmar, Peninsular Thailand, and (northern) Peninsular Malaysia. The specific name latidisca refers to the comparatively wide finger discs of this frog. Kaloula latidisca is most similar to Kaloula baleata and Kaloula indochinensis.

== Description ==
Adult males measure 49–56 mm (1.9–2.2 in) in snout–vent length. An immature female measured 42 mm (1.7 in) SVL. The overall appearance is robust. The head is wider than it is long. The eyes are large. The tympanum is covered by skin and not visible. The supratympanic fold is present. The finger tips are expanded into large, transversely expanded discs, whereas the toe discs are small and rounded. The fingers have no webbing whereas the toes are partially webbed. The dorsal colouration is gray-brown. There is a pale interorbital bar. Symmetrical, broad, wavy stripes start from the posterior edge of upper eyelid and extend dorsolaterally to the scapular region, fading posteriorly. The dorsal surfaces, apart from the dorsolateral stripes, are scattered with small, irregular, black blotches. The ventrum is brown with faint, light reticulations. The gular region is blackish and covered with small, light spots.

== Habitat and conservation ==
The type series was collected at night on tree trunks or in tree holes 2–3 m above ground, whereas the immature female was found in a field near a village. Zug (2022) classifies Kaloula latidisca as a terrestrial frog inhabiting both primary and secondary forests. It probably breeds in ephemeral pools, as closely related Kaloula baleata does.

Although Kaloula latidisca is probably tolerant to habitat disturbance, large-scale logging is a potential threat to this species. The type locality is within the Ulu Muda Forest Reserve, bot logging takes place inside the reserve.
