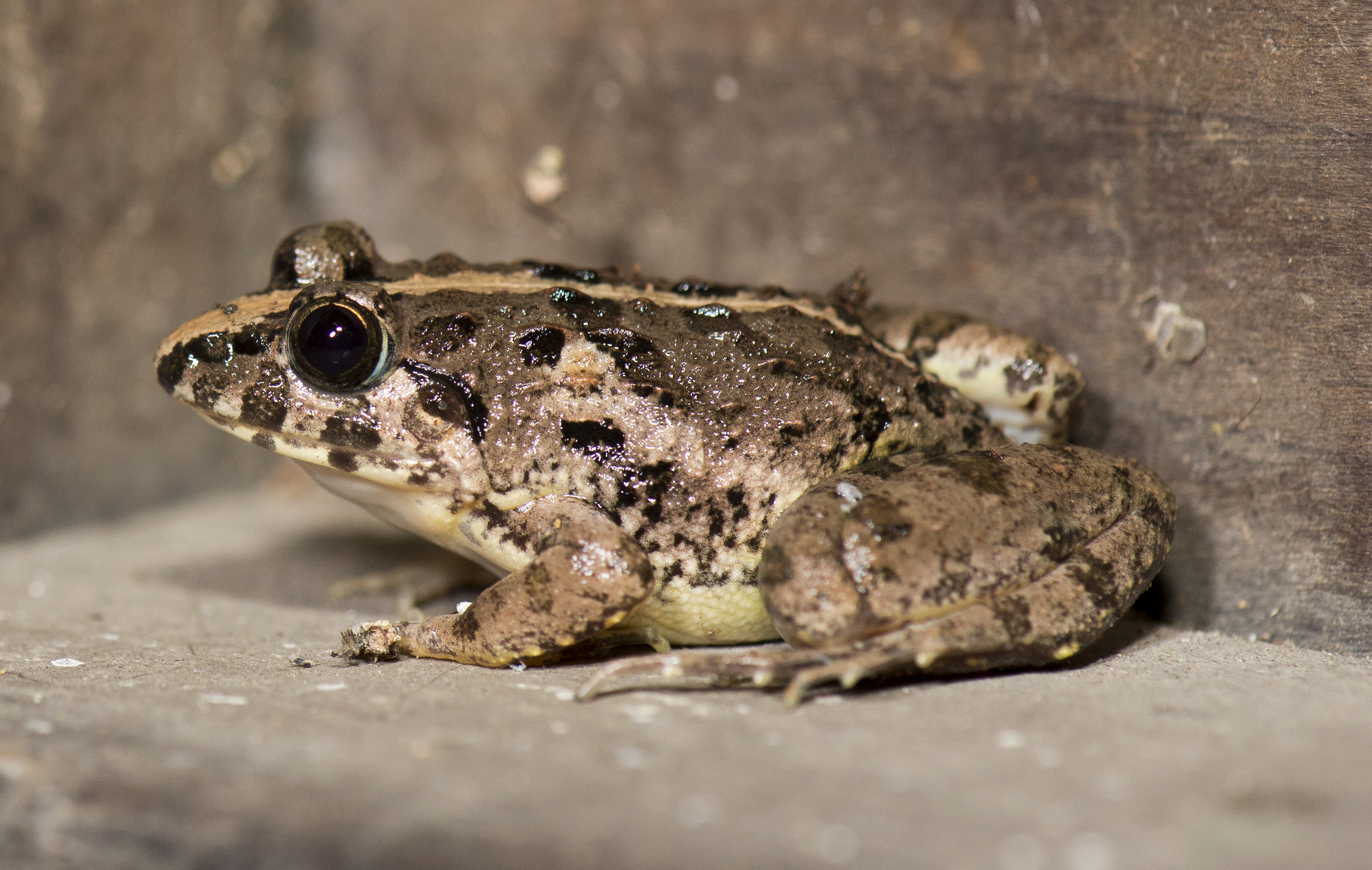
- Guandu Nature Park, Taiwan

Conservation status
- Least Concern (IUCN 3.1)

Scientific classification
- Kingdom: Animalia
- Phylum: Chordata
- Class: Amphibia
- Order: Anura
- Family: Dicroglossidae
- Genus: Fejervarya
- Species: F. limnocharis

Binomial name
- Fejervarya limnocharis (Gravenhorst, 1829)

Synonyms
- Rana limnocharis Gravenhorst, 1829; Limonectes limnocharis (Gravenhorst, 1829); Rana wasl Annandale, 1917

= Fejervarya limnocharis =

Species of amphibian

Fejervarya limnocharis is a species of frog found in South East Asia and parts of Indochina. It is known under many common names, including Boie's wart frog, rice field frog, and Asian grass frog. Molecular studies of the species complex (after Boulenger) suggest that there may be multiple species involved.

== Description ==
Snout pointed, projecting beyond mouth. Canthus obtuse, loreal oblique, more or less concave. Internarial space is longer than interorbital width, which is much less than width of the upper eyelid. Tympanum distinct, half to twothirds the diameter of eye. Fingers obtusely pointed, first longer than second, subarticular tubercles very prominent. Tibiotarsal articulation reaches tympanum or naris. Toes obtuse or with slightly swollen tips, half webbed, subarticular tubercles small and prominent. Body with small tubercles, sometimes small longitudinal folds are present, ventrum smooth except belly and thighs which are granular posteriorly. Male with loose gular region, with brown or blackish W-shaped mark, fore limbs stronger, with pad like subdigital tubercles under first finger. Snout-vent length 39–43 mm.

Color: Gray brown or olive above, sometimes suffused with bright carmine; a V-shaped dark mark between eyes, a yellow vertebral stripe mostly present; lips and limbs barred, a light line along calf, thighs laterally yellow, marbled with black, ventrum white, throat is mottled with brown in male.

The species forms a complex with several genetic variants that may represent multiple species.

== Distribution ==
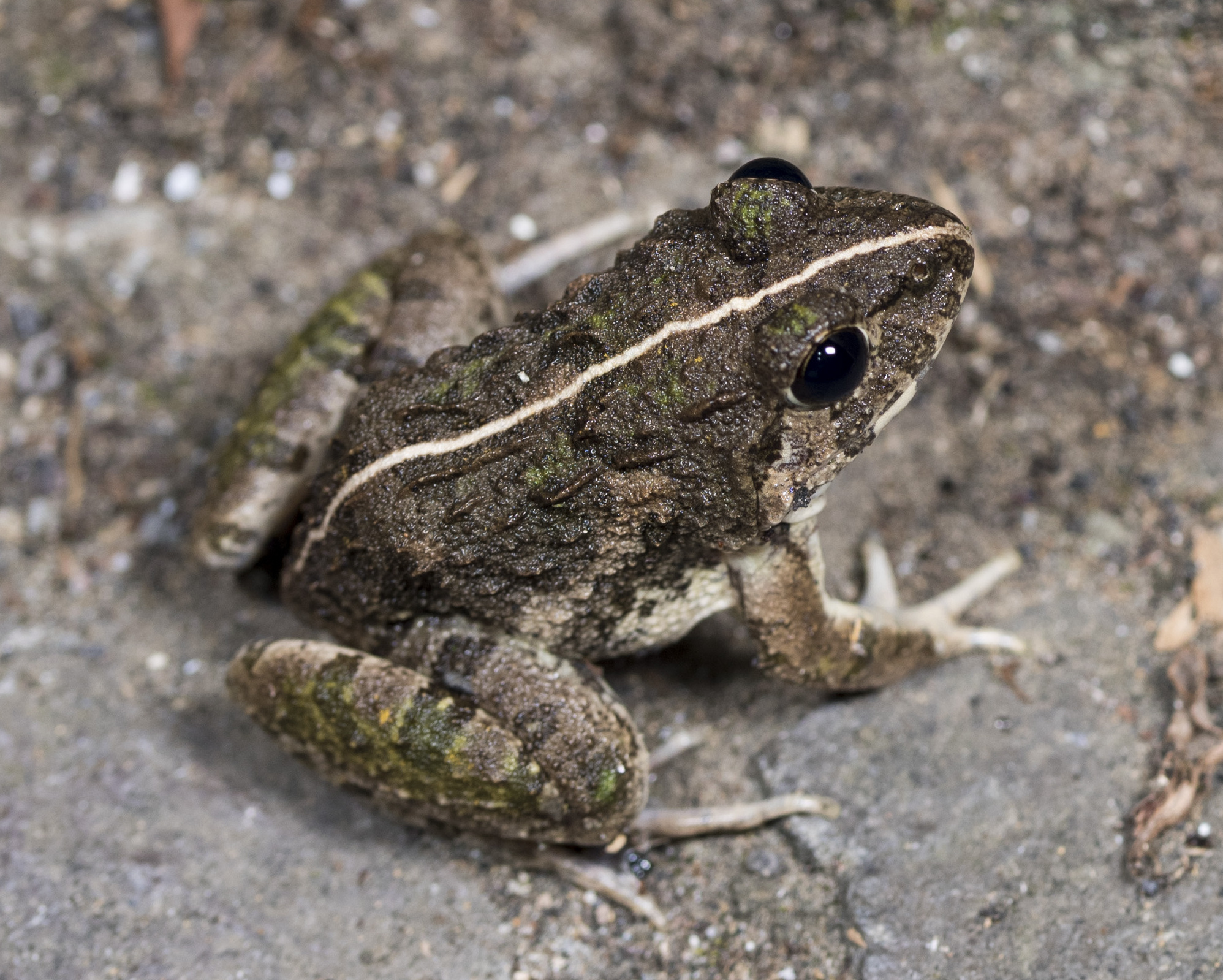
Lugu, Nantao, Taiwan

This species inhabits parts of South East Asia and Indochina.

Earlier, due to misidentification, this species was erroneously and extralimitally reported from South Asia but later have been found to be in error. According to the Amphibian Species of the World, records outside Indonesia, Malaysia, Thailand, Burma, Cambodia, Laos, and Vietnam are almost certainly representing other species.

Fejervarya limnocharis is one of the few frog species commonly found in oil palm plantations in Malaysia, in addition to Microhyla heymonsi and Hylarana erythraea.

== Consumption ==
Fejervarya limnocharis is commonly sold as food in Southeast Asia, including Thailand, Laos, and Cambodia. In Cambodia, it is frequently collected for human consumption, along with Hoplobatrachus rugulosus, Glyphoglossus molossus, Kaloula pulchra, Duttaphrynus melanostictus, and Pelophylax lateralis (with P. lateralis found only north of the Mekong River in localities such as Snuol District, Kratie Province).
