= Balbalasang–Balbalan National Park =

National park of the Philippines

- IUCN category II (national park)
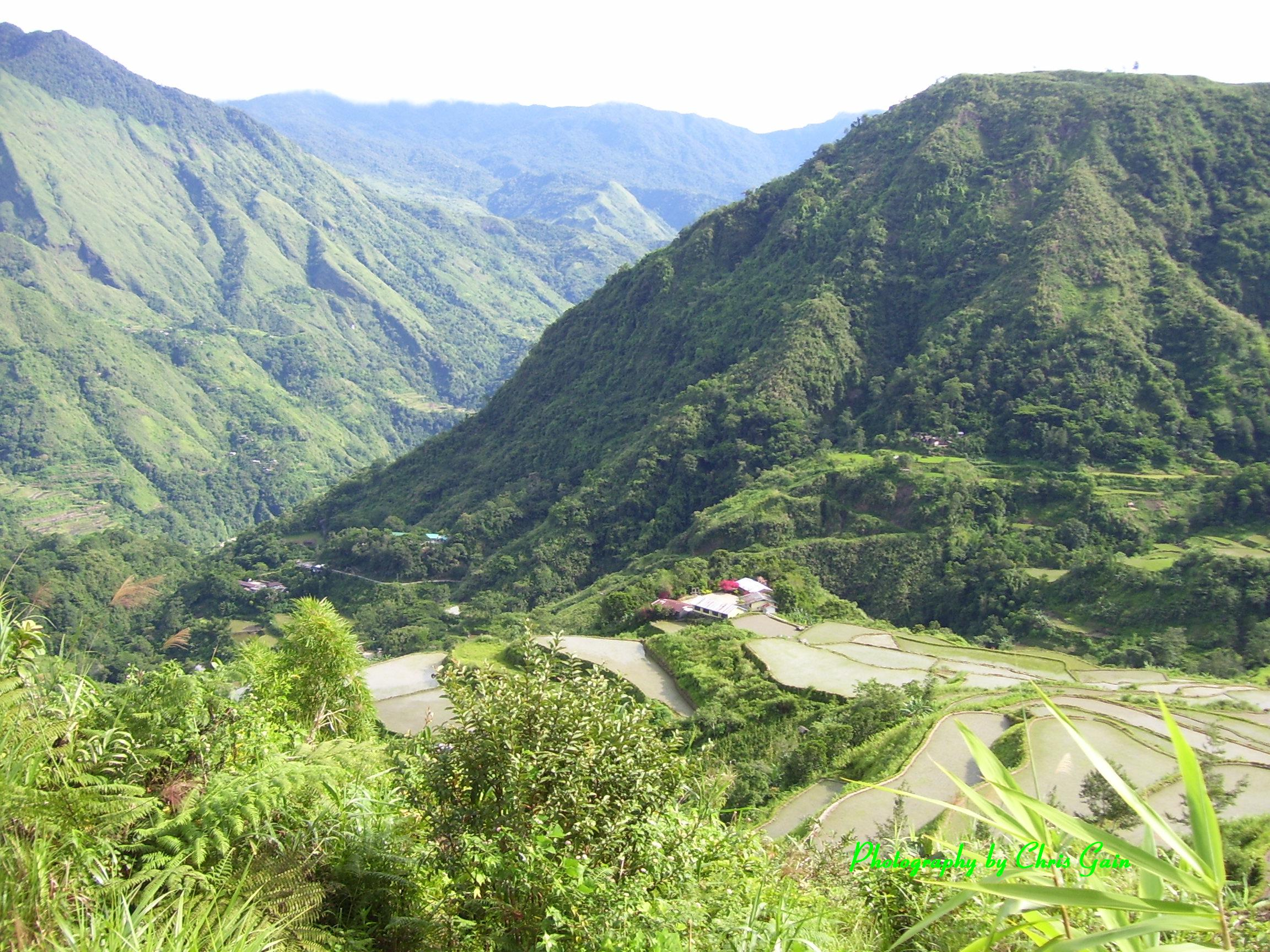
- View of Mount Balbalasang from Pasil Valley

- Location within Philippines
- Location: Cordillera, Philippines
- Nearest city: Tuguegarao and Tabuk
- Coordinates: 17°27′N 121°09′E
- Area: 1,338 hectares (3,310 acres)
- Established: June 17, 1972
- Governing body: Department of Environment and Natural Resources

Balbalasang–Balbalan National Park (also known as Mount Balbalasang National Park) is a protected area of the Philippines located in the municipality of Balbalan, Kalinga in the Cordillera Administrative Region.

== Geography ==
The park covers an area of 1,338 hectares and is centered on Mount Balbalasang in the barangay of the same name near the provincial border with Abra. Dubbed the "green heart of the Cordillera", the park is representative of the rich biodiversity and landscape of this mountain region with some of the most intact pine forests and richly endemic flora and fauna. It was declared a national park in 1972 by virtue of Republic Act No. 6463.

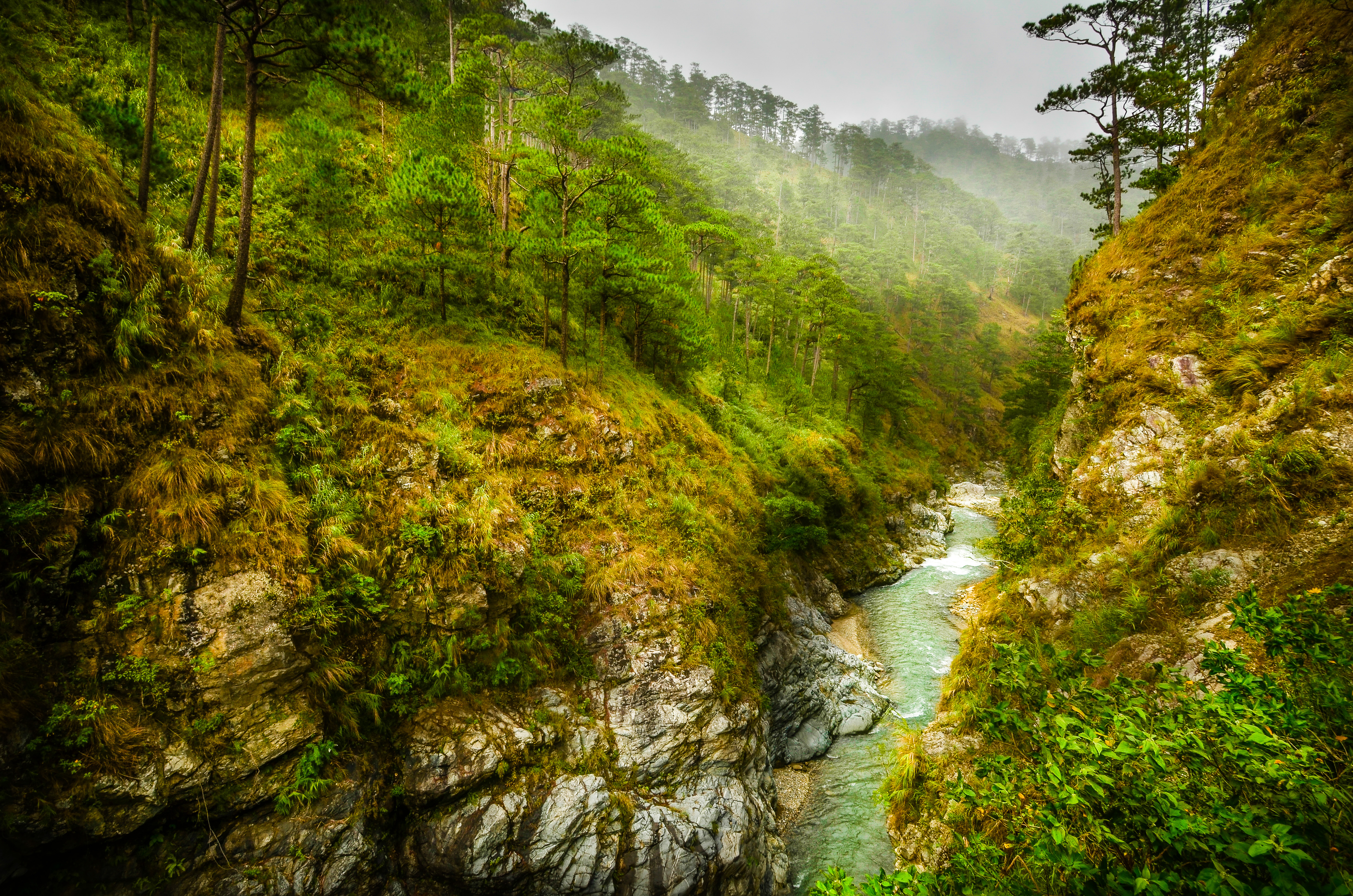
Balbalasang-Balbalan National Park

The Park belongs to the Luzon Biogeographic Region, a unique center of endemism in Luzon. It is composed of two mountain ranges within the Cordillera Central with numerous rivers and creeks all draining towards the Saltan River. Mount Sapocoy is the highest peak at 2,456 m. It is located at the western boundary of the park overlooking the Ilocos and Cagayan Valley. The lowest point in the park, with an elevation of 700 m, is at Balbalan in the eastern portion.

In 2022, Republic Act No. 11688 merged this national park and the Banao watershed into the Banao Protected Landscape (BPL).

=== Flora and fauna ===
At elevations above 1,000 m, the park consists of hardwood, pine and mossy forests. A species of Rafflesia flower has also been discovered in the park.

An important center for biodiversity conservation, the park is home to 89 species of birds, of which 39 are endemic to the Philippines and 2 of them can only be found in Luzon, the Isabela oriole and flame-breasted fruit dove. While none of the recorded species in the park is critical or endangered, four species of birds are categorized vulnerable (2002 IUCN Red List of Threatened Species), among them are the whiskered pitta, Luzon water-redstart and Luzon jungle flycatcher. The park has been designated an Important Bird Area (IBA) by BirdLife International because it supports a significant population of chestnut-faced babblers.

In addition, 23 species of mammals, 13 species of amphibians, 13 species of reptiles and 25 species of earthworms have also been documented. Among them are the Philippine warty pig, Luzon striped rat, Northern Luzon giant cloud rat, Kalinga narrowmouth toad, and Luzon narrow-mouthed frog. Two of these mammal species are listed as endangered, namely the Luzon pygmy fruit bat and the Luzon bushy-tailed cloud rat.

== See also ==
- List of national parks of the Philippines
