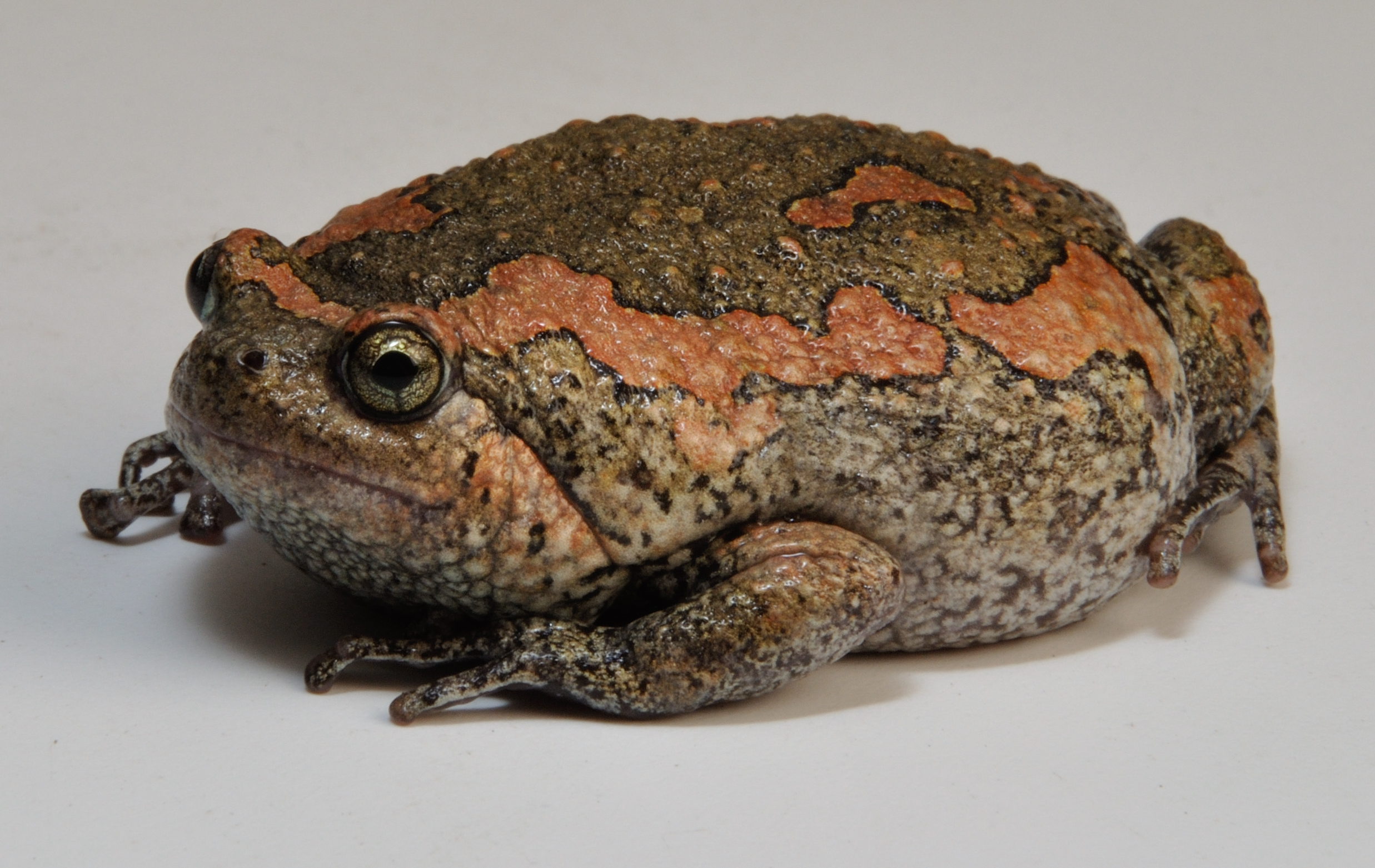

Conservation status
- Least Concern (IUCN 3.1)

Scientific classification
- Kingdom: Animalia
- Phylum: Chordata
- Class: Amphibia
- Order: Anura
- Family: Microhylidae
- Genus: Uperodon
- Species: U. taprobanicus

Binomial name
- Uperodon taprobanicus (Parker, 1934)

Synonyms
- Kaloula pulchra taprobanica Parker, 1934; Kaloula taprobanica Parker, 1934

= Uperodon taprobanicus =

Species of amphibian

Uperodon taprobanicus, also known as the Sri Lankan bullfrog, Sri Lankan painted frog, Sri Lankan kaloula, Ceylon kaloula, Indian painted frog, or painted globular frog, is a species of narrow-mouthed frog found in Nepal, Bangladesh, southern and eastern India, and Sri Lanka up to an altitude of about 1300 metres. It can grow to an adult length of up to 75 millimetres(7.5 cm) long from snout to vent. It was originally described as a subspecies of Kaloula pulchra, ssp. taprobanica. The IUCN lists it as being of "Least Concern".

== Phylogeny ==
Blackburn and colleagues (2013) suggested that Uperodon taprobanicus, then recognized as K. taprobanica, might not form a clade with the other Kaloula species, although it did clearly form a clade with Metaphrynella, Ramanella, and the rest of Kaloula. De Sá and colleagues (2012) grouped Uperodon taprobanicus (as K. taprobanica) as a sister clade to Ramanella and Uperodon rather than with the rest of Kaloula, which De Sá et al. (2012) listed as a sister clade to Metaphrynella and Phrynella. In 2016, Peloso and colleagues synonymized Ramanella with Uperodon and transferred this species to the genus Uperodon.

== Description ==
This plump species of frog attains a snout–vent length of about 75 millimetres (3.0 in), with females being slightly larger than males. The colour of the dorsal surface is greyish-black with a symmetrical pattern of reddish-brown patches on either side including a band of colour stretching from the back of the eye to the base of the arm. The underparts are pale yellowish-grey, mottled with black or brown. During the breeding season, males develop a dark throat patch.

== Distribution and habitat ==
Uperodon taprobanicus is native to Sri Lanka, India, Bangladesh and Nepal, and is most common in southern India and Sri Lanka. Uperodon taprobanicus and Kaloula assamensis are distributed to the west and north of the Brahmaputra River, respectively, while Kaloula pulchra is located to the east and south of it, since the Brahmaputra River serves as a barrier to dispersal. This species has an isolated pocket distribution in parts of Gujarat and Rajasthan.

In India, it is found in the states of West Bengal, Odisha, Assam, Karnataka, Kerala, Telangana, Tamil Nadu, and Andhra Pradesh, and is most common in the southern areas of the Western and Eastern Ghats. It is most common in Sri Lanka, where it is dispersed across the island at elevations from sea level to up to 1300 metres.

Uperodon taprobanicus is a fossorial species, spending the day buried in the leaf litter, in loose soil or under fallen logs, but can also climb into the branches of trees. The habitats it prefers include dry forests, coconut and rubber plantations, wetlands, rice fields and disturbed areas close to dwellings.

== Behaviour ==
This frog feeds on a variety of insects. It breeds at the start of the rainy season and males call from suitable water bodies. The eggs float on the surface of the water in a single layer. The tadpoles are black.

At least one instance has been observed of a mutualistic relationship between the frog and a Poecilotheria tarantula, a spider of a size and aggression "quite capable of killing and eating small frogs." Instead, as observed in frog Chiasmocleis ventrimaculata and tarantula Xenesthis immanis, the spider may protect the frog from predators while the frog protect the spider's eggs from ants. Uperodon taprobanicus and the Poeciltheria species were observed emerging from the same tree hole and then standing closely next to each other with no predation of the frog occurring from the tarantula.

Uperodon taprobanicus is often a characteristic of wildlife diversity in a region, often indicating that an area supports rare or threatened species.

== Status ==
This frog has a wide range and the population seems to be reasonably stable. The IUCN rates it as being of "Least Concern" as it considers that the rate of decline, if any, is insufficient to justify listing it in a more threatened category. This frog is common over much of its range and the threats it faces have been identified as degradation of its habitat and pollution by agrochemicals of the water bodies in which it breeds.

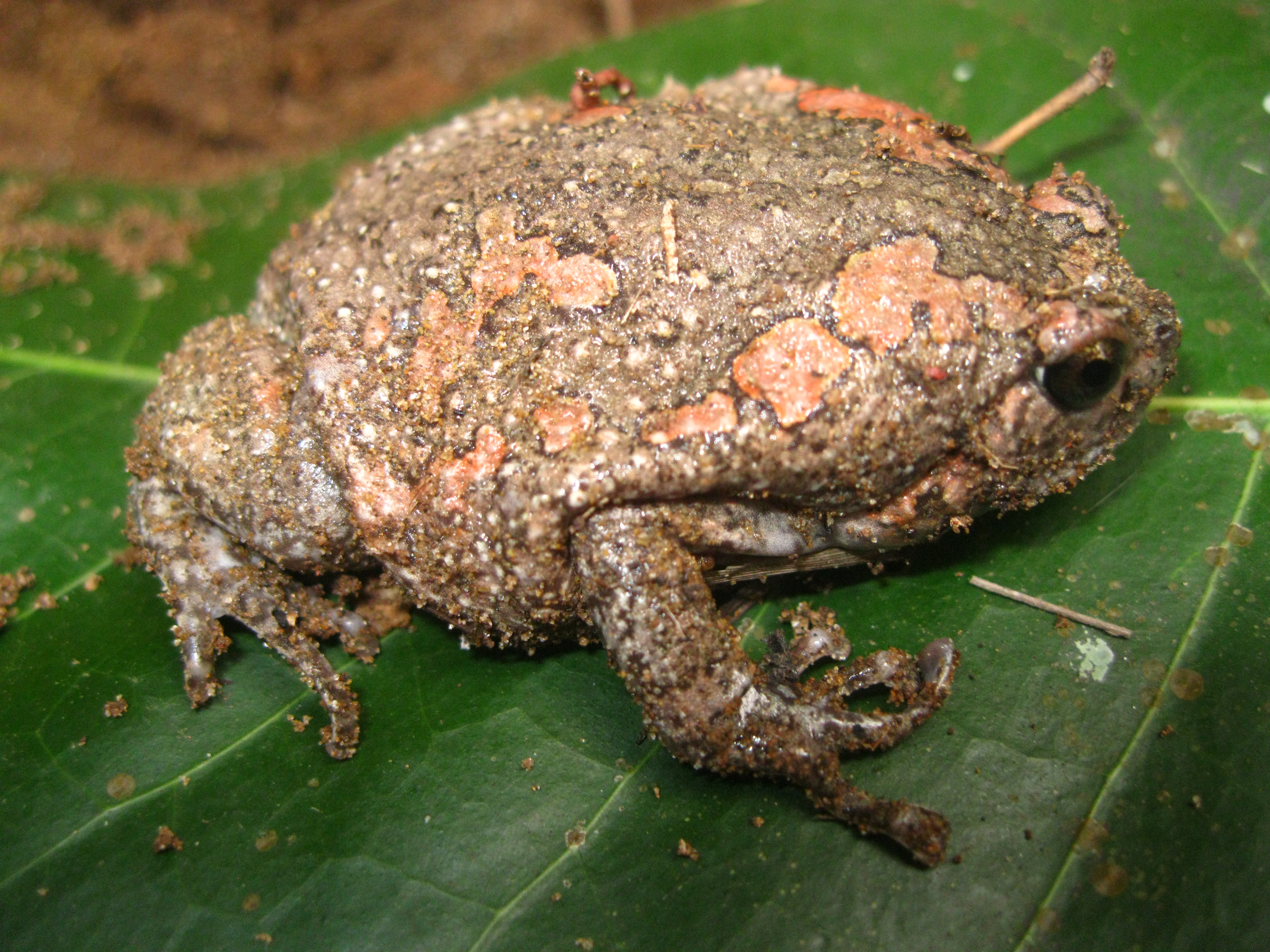

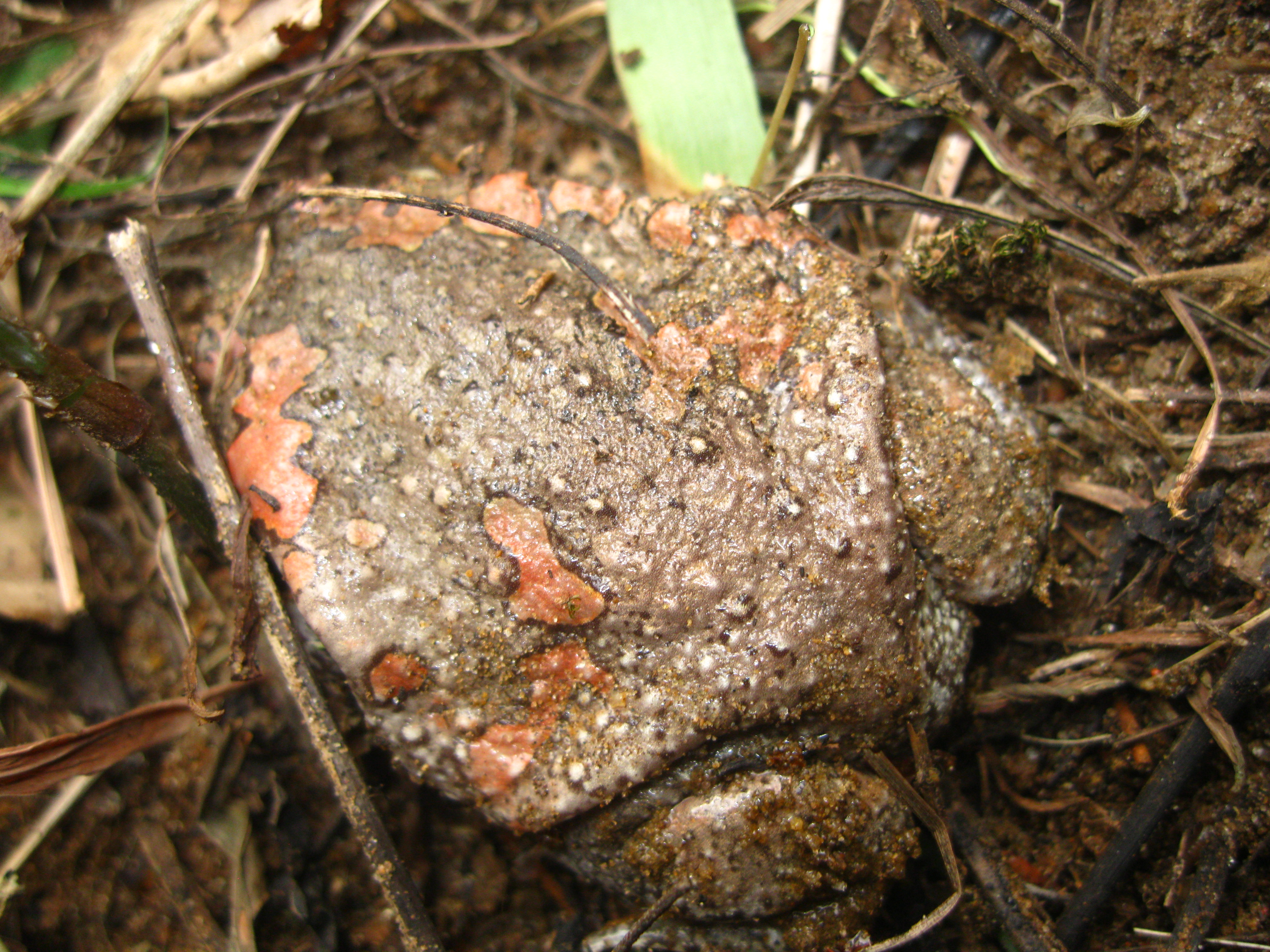

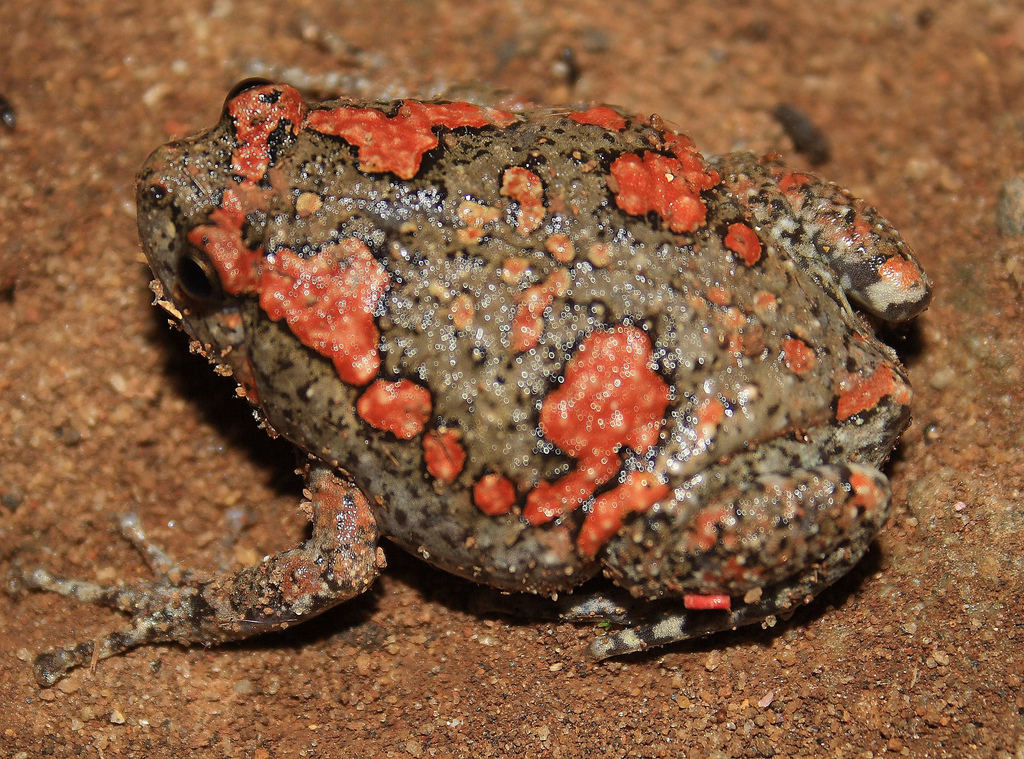
