= Kaloula walteri =

Conservation status
- Vulnerable (IUCN 3.1)

Scientific classification
- Kingdom: Animalia
- Phylum: Chordata
- Class: Amphibia
- Order: Anura
- Family: Microhylidae
- Genus: Kaloula
- Species: K. walteri

Binomial name
- Kaloula walteri Diesmos, Brown, and Alcala, 2002

Species of frog

Kaloula walteri is a species of frog in the family Microhylidae. . The specific name walteri honors Walter C. Brown, an American herpetologist. Common name Walter's narrow-mouthed frog has been proposed for it. Kaloula walteri is most closely related to Kaloula rigida.

== Description ==
Adult males measure 25–32 mm (1.0–1.3 in) and adult females, based on a single specimen only, 31 mm (1.2 in) in snout–vent length. The overall appearance is rotund. The head is small. The snout is slightly pointed. The tympanum is partially concealed by the supratympanic fold. The fingers have slightly expanded discs. The toes have barely evident fleshy basal webbing. Skin is smooth. Dorsal coloration is reddish brown, gray brown, dark lavender, or light gray. Most specimens have marbled dorsal pattern, but some are uniformly colored. The venter is light reddish to orange brown with pale yellowish to whitish spots, or rarely pale gray with cream spots. The throat is reddish brown in the female and very dark gray to black in males.

== Habitat and conservation ==
Kaloula walteri inhabits lower montane and lowland forests at elevations up to 1,000 m (3,300 ft) above sea level. It can occasionally be found in human-modified habitats beside such forests. Its preferred habitat are cool and unpolluted mountain streams and ephemeral pools, which are also its larval habitat. It is sometimes observed in dry stream beds too. It can be locally common in mountain streams. However, it is threatened by habitat loss caused by small-scale shifting agriculture, expanding human settlements, wood collection, and illegal logging. It is present in Mount Banahaw-San Cristobal Protected Landscape and Mount Isarog Natural Park.
