= Kaloula aureata =

Conservation status
- Data Deficient (IUCN 3.1)

Scientific classification
- Kingdom: Animalia
- Phylum: Chordata
- Class: Amphibia
- Order: Anura
- Family: Microhylidae
- Genus: Kaloula
- Species: K. aureata

Binomial name
- Kaloula aureata Nutphand, 1989

Species of amphibian

Kaloula aureata, also known as the golden burrowing frog or golden bullfrog, is a species of frogs in the family Microhylidae. It is endemic to southern Thailand with records from the Surat Thani and Nakhon Si Thammarat provinces. The validity of this poorly known species has been questioned, and Ohler (2003) tentatively considered it synonym of Kaloula pulchra macrocephala. However, following Pauwels and Chérot (2006), it is now recognized as a valid species.

== Description ==
The lectotype is a male measuring 60 mm (2.4 in) in snout–vent length. The fingers are slender. The toe tips may be broadened into small disc-shaped pads. Dorsal skin is finely granulated. The body has brown ground colour with irregular yellow marks that give a golden aspect to the whole body – hence the specific name aureata. The belly is white.

== Habitat and conservation ==
There is little ecological information on this species. It appeared to be rare at the time of collection of the type series in the 1970s. It comes from a region dominated by semi-evergreen rainforest. Reproduction is assumed to take place in seasonal pools. Habitat loss (deforestation) is occurring in the region and is a possible threat to this species.
