= Kaloula nonggangensis =

Conservation status
- Data Deficient (IUCN 3.1)

Scientific classification
- Kingdom: Animalia
- Phylum: Chordata
- Class: Amphibia
- Order: Anura
- Family: Microhylidae
- Genus: Kaloula
- Species: K. nonggangensis

Binomial name
- Kaloula nonggangensis Mo, Zhang, Zhou, Chen, Tang, Meng, and Chen, 2013

Species of amphibian

Kaloula nonggangensis is a species of frog in the family Microhylidae. It is endemic to China, where it is so far only known from the vicinity of its type locality in Nonggang National Nature Reserve in Longzhou County, southwestern Guangxi. Its range might extend into nearby Vietnam. Common name Nonggang narrow-mouthed frog has been coined for it.

== Description ==
Adult males measure 41–53 mm (1.6–2.1 in) and adult females, based only a single specimen, 52 mm (2.0 in) in snout–vent length. The overall appearance is rotund. The snout is slightly pointed with its tip rounded. The tympanum is hidden and indistinct; the tympanic fold can be prominent or indistinct. The limbs are relatively short. The fingers have no webbing but they bear obviously dilated disks. The toes have no discs but are almost completely webbed (two thirds webbed in the female). Skin is smooth. The upper parts are light olive green with dark moss-green marbling; the loreal region, tympanic region, and tympanum are slightly dark olive-green. The lower parts are creamy white. Males have a subgular vocal sac.

Kaloula nonggangensis is only known from the Nonggang National Nature Reserve in southwestern Guangxi, China

== Habitat and conservation ==
Kaloula nonggangensis is known from primary and secondary karst evergreen forests, and from cultivated fields near the forest, at elevations of 150–200 m (490–660 ft) above sea level. Individuals have been observed gathering in a temporary pool after a rainstorm.

The entire known range of this species is within a protected area. There are no known threats.
