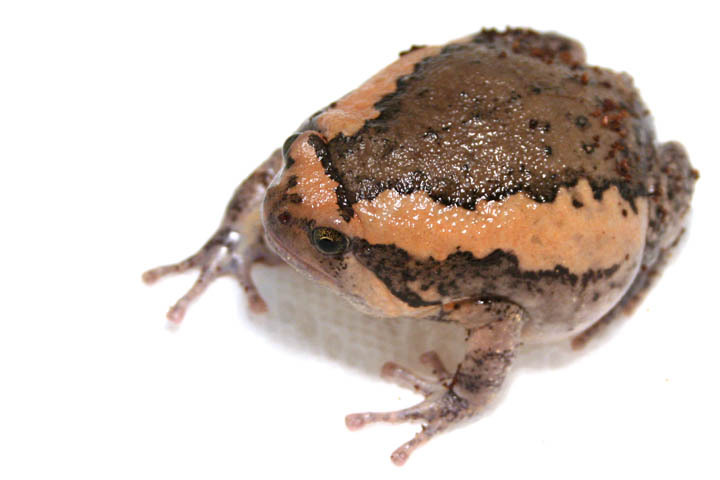
- Banded bullfrog, Kaloula pulchra

Scientific classification
- Kingdom: Animalia
- Phylum: Chordata
- Class: Amphibia
- Order: Anura
- Family: Microhylidae
- Subfamily: Microhylinae
- Genus: Kaloula; Gray, 1831

Type species
- Kaloula pulchra Gray, 1831

Diversity
- About 19 species (see text)

= Kaloula =

Kaloula Temporal range: Miocene - Present, 22.3–0 Ma

Genus of amphibians

Kaloula is a genus of microhylid frogs found in southern and eastern Asia. They are sometimes known as the Asian narrowmouth toads.

== Species ==
The genus currently has at least 19 species. Some sources also recognize Kaloula macrocephala Bourret, 1942 as a valid species, whereas the Amphibian Species of the World treats it as a synonym of Kaloula pulchra. 5 new species have been described since 2000, and there are unnamed species yet to be described.

Binomial name and author	Common name	Range
Kaloula assamensis Das, Sengupta, Ahmed, and Dutta, 2005		Assam, India
Kaloula aureata Nutphand, 1989	Golden bullfrog	southern Thailand
Kaloula baleata (Müller in Oort & Müller, 1836)	Flower pot toad	South-eastern Asia
Kaloula borealis (Barbour, 1908)		North-eastern Asia
Kaloula conjuncta (Peters, 1863)	Truncate-toed chorus frog	Philippines
Kaloula ghoshi Cherchi, 1954	Brown bullfrog	Andaman Islands
Kaloula indochinensis Chan, Blackburn, Murphy, Stuart, Emmett, Ho, and Brown, 2013		Indochina
Kaloula kalingensis Taylor, 1922	Kalinga narrowmouth toad	Philippines
Kaloula kokacii Ross & Gonzales, 1992	Catanduanes narrow-mouthed frog	northern Philippines
Kaloula latidisca Chan, Grismer & Brown, 2014	Wide-disked narrow-mouthed frog	Malaysia
Kaloula mediolineata Smith, 1917		Indochina
Kaloula meridionalis Inger, 1954		Philippines
Kaloula nonggangensis Mo, Zhang, Zhou, Chen, Tang, Meng, and Chen, 2013		Guangxi, south-western China
Kaloula picta (Duméril & Bibron, 1841)	Slender-digit chorus frog	Philippines
Kaloula pulchra Gray, 1831	Banded bullfrog, Chubby frog	Southern and south-eastern Asia
Kaloula rigida Taylor, 1922	Luzon narrow-mouthed frog	northern Philippines
Kaloula rugifera Stejneger, 1924		South-western China
Kaloula verrucosa Boulenger, 1904		South-western China
Kaloula walteri Diesmos, Brown & Alcala, 2002		northern Philippines

Kaloula pulchra, Kaloula picta, and Kaloula borealis are the most widespread and commonly found varieties, often living near human settlements.

Blackburn, et al. (2013) lists several Kaloula varieties that are likely to be new, previously undescribed species.

- Kaloula sp. nov. Palawan: Closely related to Kaloula baleata. Recorded in Palawan.
- Kaloula sp. nov. Sulawesi: Closely related to Kaloula baleata. Recorded in the Togian Islands (Batudaka Island), Central Sulawesi, and North Sulawesi (Bogani Nani Wartabone National Park).
- Kaloula sp. nov. Sibuyan: Closely related to Kaloula conjuncta. Recorded on Sibuyan Island and Mount Baloy, Panay.
- Kaloula sp. nov. Samar & Leyte: Related to Kaloula conjuncta and Kaloula picta. Recorded in Taft, Eastern Samar, and Danao and Baybay in Leyte.
- Kaloula sp. nov. Panay: Related to Kaloula kalingensis and Kaloula kokacii. Recorded in Sibalom, Antique Province, Panay.
- Kaloula sp. nov. East Luzon: Related to Kaloula kalingensis and Kaloula kokacii. Recorded on Mount Makiling, Sierra Madres, and Aurora Memorial National Park.

== Phylogeny ==
A molecular phylogenetic study by Mo et al. (2013) suggests that the only four Kaloula species found in China, namely Kaloula borealis, Kaloula nonggangensis, Kaloula rugifera, and Kaloula verrucosa, belong to a monophyletic group, termed the K. verrucosa group.

Blackburn, et al. (2013) consider Kaloula species endemic to the Philippines to form a monophyletic group, containing the species Kaloula walteri, Kaloula rigida, Kaloula conjuncta, Kaloula picta, Kaloula kalingensis, and Kaloula kokacii. Kaloula likely colonized the Philippines from Southeast Asia during the Late Miocene, and then radiated into different ecotypes. K. kalingensis and K. kokacii occupy niches as arboreal tree-hole frogs in northern and southern Luzon respectively, while K. rigida and K. walteri are ground frogs in northern and southern Luzon respectively. K. picta, which is a terrestrial ground frog, and K. conjuncta, which is scansorial (climbing) and prefers shrubs, have established themselves throughout the Philippine archipelago. K. picta as well as K. pulchra display the lowest internal genetic diversity, but also have widespread geographical distributions that may have likely occurred be due to human activity.

Excluding Kaloula taprobanica, the most recent common ancestor of Kaloula likely existed about 22.3 million years ago, around the Oligocene–Miocene boundary. The most recent common ancestor of the terrestrial species K. rigida and K. walteri likely lived 4.8 million years ago during the Early Pliocene, while that of the arboreal species K. kalingensis and K. kokacii likely lived 9.1 million years ago. The most recent common ancestor of K. conjuncta, which currently has four recognized subspecies, likely lived 4.4 million years ago.

Blackburn, et al. (2013) suggests that Kaloula taprobanica might not form a clade with the other Kaloula species, although it does clearly form a clade with Metaphrynella, Ramanella, and the rest of Kaloula.

Other studies relating to Kaloula phylogeny include van Bocxlaer et al. (2007), Matsui et al. (2011), and Trueb et al. (2011).

The following phylogeny has been adapted from Blackburn, et al. (2013). Kaloula assamensis, Kaloula taprobanica, and Kaloula aureata have not been included.

- Kaloula
  - Kaloula verrucosa, Kaloula borealis, Kaloula rugifera, Kaloula nonggangensis
  - - Kaloula pulchra
    - - Kaloula mediolineata
      - - Kaloula baleata, Kaloula indochinensis, Kaloula latidisca
        - (Philippine radiation)
          - - Kaloula kalingensis
            - Kaloula kokacii
          - - - Kaloula conjuncta
              - Kaloula picta
            - - Kaloula rigida
              - Kaloula walteri
