= Narrow-mouthed toad (disambiguation) =

The narrow-mouthed toad is a genus of microhylid frogs found in the Americas between Honduras and the southern United States.

Narrow-mouthed toad may also refer to:

- Butler's narrow-mouthed toad, a frog found in India, Myanmar, China, Hong Kong, Taiwan, Thailand, Cambodia, Laos, Vietnam, Malaysia, and Singapore
- Mexican narrow-mouthed toad, a frog native to North America
- Mount Elimbari narrow-mouthed toad, a frog endemic to Papua New Guinea
- Ornate narrow-mouthed toad, a frog found in South Asia
- Stejneger's narrow-mouthed toad, a frog endemic to Taiwan
- Two-spaded narrow-mouthed toad, a frog found in El Salvador, Guatemala, and Mexico

== See also ==
- Narrowmouth toad (disambiguation)
