= Bicol narrowmouth toad =

Conservation status
- Least Concern (IUCN 3.1)

Scientific classification
- Kingdom: Animalia
- Phylum: Chordata
- Class: Amphibia
- Order: Anura
- Family: Microhylidae
- Genus: Kaloula
- Species: K. kokacii

Binomial name
- Kaloula kokacii Ross & Gonzales, 1992

Species of amphibian

The Bicol narrowmouth toad or Catanduanes narrow-mouthed frog (Kaloula kokacii) is a species of frog in the family Microhylidae. It is endemic to the Philippines, where it is found in the Bicol Peninsula and Catanduanes Island. Its natural habitats are subtropical or tropical moist lowland forests, subtropical or tropical moist montane forests, pastureland, plantations, rural gardens, and heavily degraded former forest. It is threatened by habitat loss.
