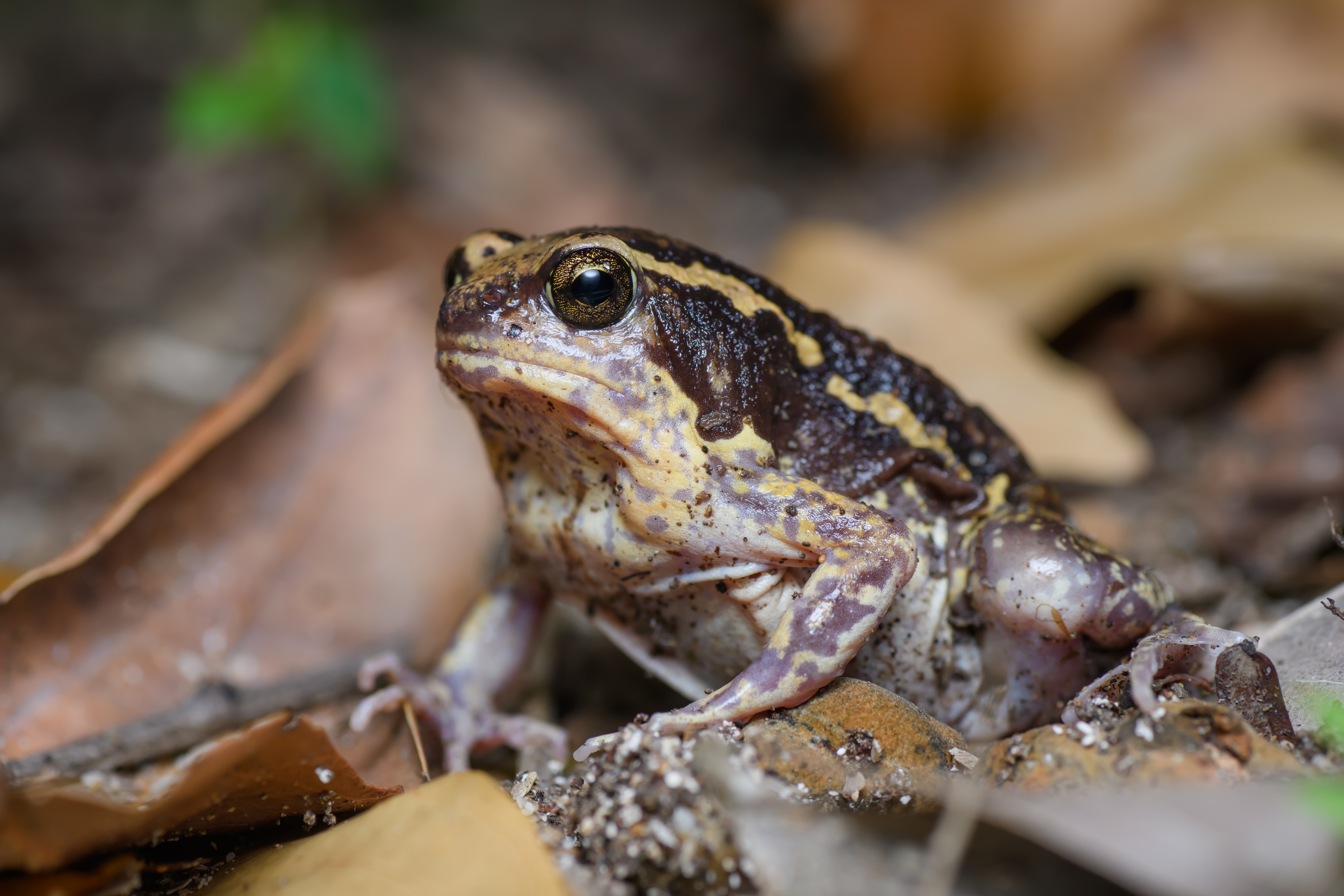

Conservation status
- Near Threatened (IUCN 3.1)

Scientific classification
- Kingdom: Animalia
- Phylum: Chordata
- Class: Amphibia
- Order: Anura
- Family: Microhylidae
- Genus: Kaloula
- Species: K. mediolineata

Binomial name
- Kaloula mediolineata Smith, 1917

Synonyms
- Callula mediolineata Smith, 1917

= Kaloula mediolineata =

Species of frog

Kaloula mediolineata is a species of frog in the family Microhylidae. It is found in mainland Thailand, Laos, southwestern Vietnam (Dak Lak and Gia Lai), and possibly Cambodia.

It is known mostly from areas originally covered with deciduous dipterocarp forest. It breeds in seasonal pools.

Kaloula mediolineata is collected intensively for local consumption, including in northern Cambodia. It is threatened by habitat loss and likely also by human consumption.
