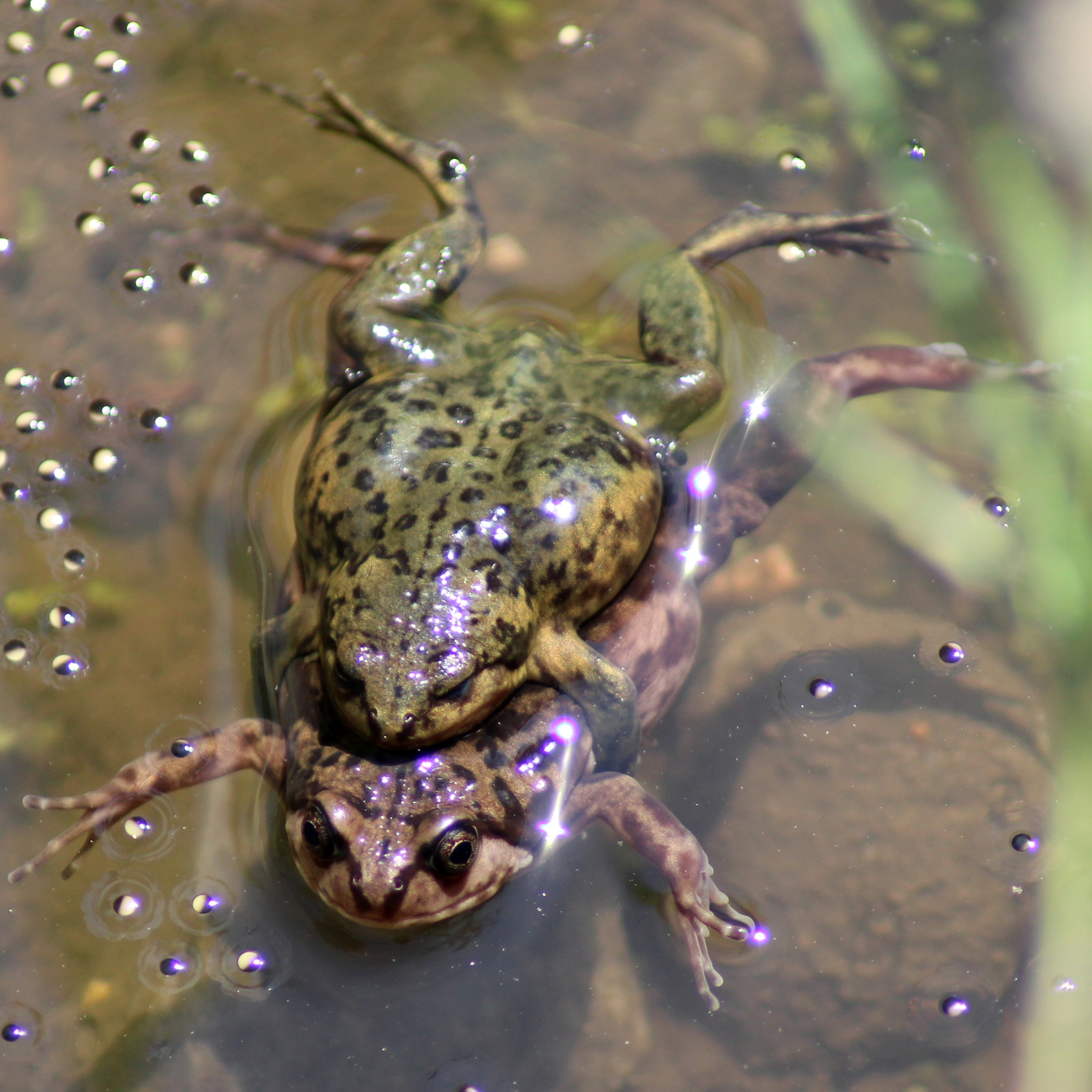

Conservation status
- Least Concern (IUCN 3.1)

Scientific classification
- Kingdom: Animalia
- Phylum: Chordata
- Class: Amphibia
- Order: Anura
- Family: Microhylidae
- Genus: Kaloula
- Species: K. rugifera

Binomial name
- Kaloula rugifera Stejneger, 1924

= Kaloula rugifera =

Species of amphibian

Kaloula rugifera, the Sichuan digging frog or Szechwan narrowmouth toad, is a species of frog in the family Microhylidae found in China.

== Range ==
It is endemic to China where it is found in Sichuan and extreme southern Gansu.

== Habitat ==
Its habitats are hilly areas near villages. It has also been recorded from tree-holes. Breeding takes place in temporary pools and ponds. This previously very common is believed to be declining because of habitat loss associated with infrastructure development.

== Description ==
Male Kaloula rugifera grow to a snout–vent length of about 39 mm (1.5 in) and females to 49 mm (1.9 in). Tadpoles are up to 31 mm (1.2 in) in length.
