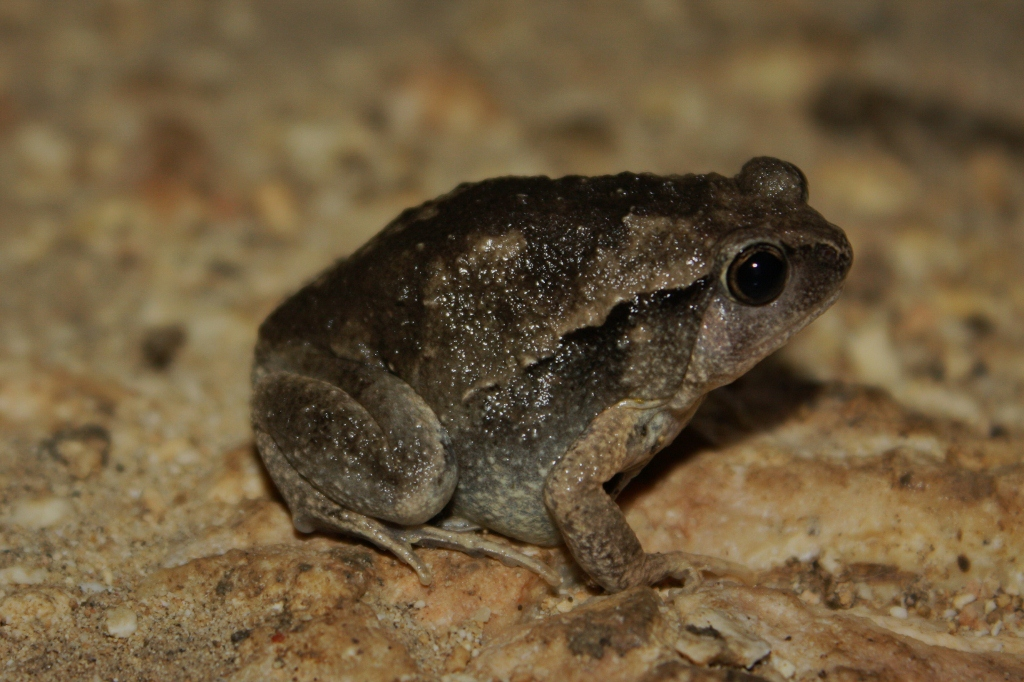

Conservation status
- Least Concern (IUCN 3.1)

Scientific classification
- Kingdom: Animalia
- Phylum: Chordata
- Class: Amphibia
- Order: Anura
- Family: Microhylidae
- Genus: Kaloula
- Species: K. picta

Binomial name
- Kaloula picta (Duméril & Bibron, 1841)

= Painted narrowmouth toad =

Species of amphibian

The painted narrowmouth toad (Kaloula picta), or slender-digit chorus frog, is a species of frog in the family Microhylidae.

It is endemic to the Philippines, where it is found throughout the archipelago, including Palawan.

== Habitat ==
Its natural habitats are subtropical or tropical moist lowland forests, subtropical or tropical moist shrubland, subtropical or tropical seasonally wet or flooded lowland grassland, rivers, intermittent rivers, freshwater lakes, intermittent freshwater lakes, freshwater marshes, intermittent freshwater marshes, arable land, pastureland, plantations, rural gardens, urban areas, water storage areas, ponds, aquaculture ponds, irrigated land, and seasonally flooded agricultural land. Humans may have facilitated the dispersal of K. picta in the Philippines as forests were converted into agricultural-use land.
