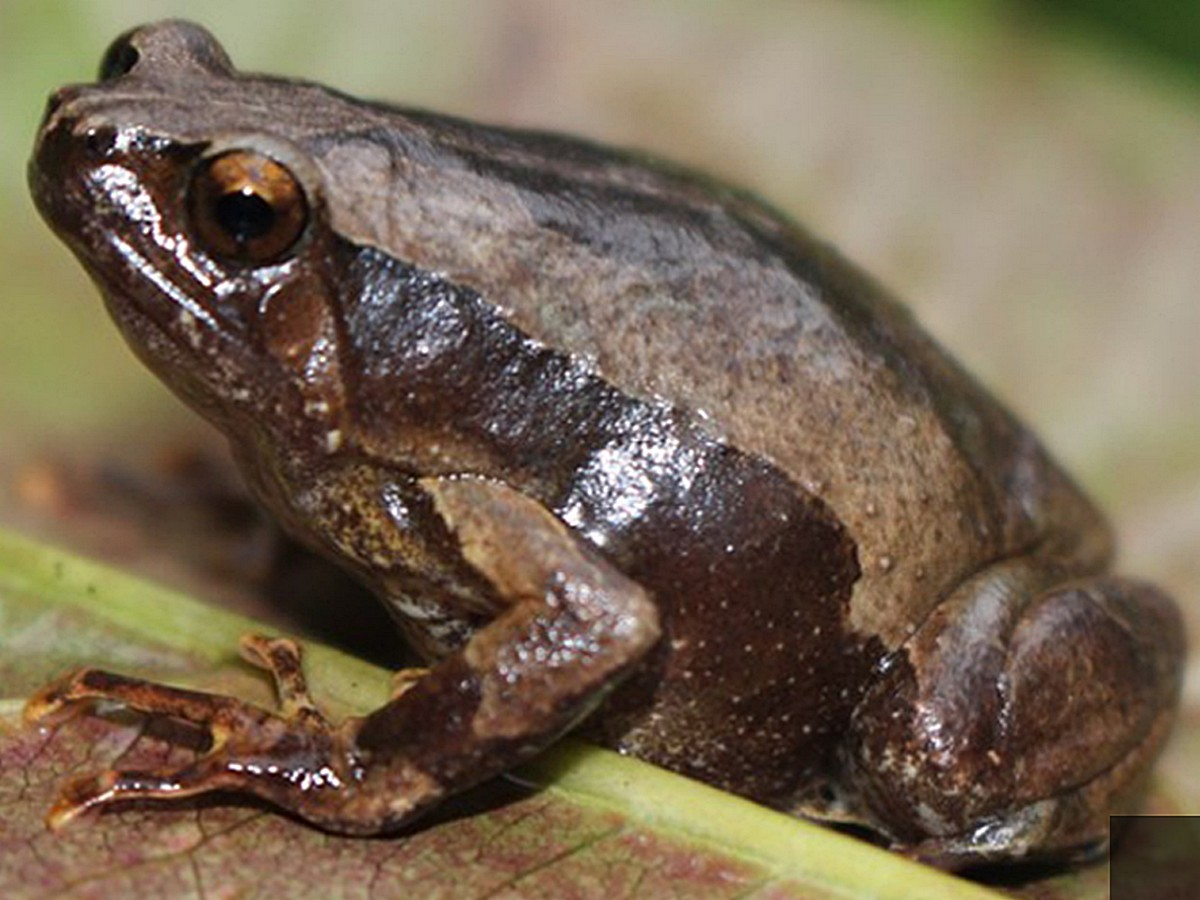

Conservation status
- Least Concern (IUCN 3.1)

Scientific classification
- Kingdom: Animalia
- Phylum: Chordata
- Class: Amphibia
- Order: Anura
- Family: Microhylidae
- Genus: Kaloula
- Species: K. conjuncta

Binomial name
- Kaloula conjuncta (Peters, 1863)

Synonyms
- Kaloula negrosensis Taylor, 1922

= Philippine narrowmouth toad =

Philippine narrowmouth toad Temporal range: Early Pliocene - Present, 4.4–0 Ma

Species of amphibian

The Philippine narrowmouth toad or the truncate-toed chorus frog (Kaloula conjuncta) is a species of frog in the family Microhylidae. It is endemic to the Philippines. Its natural habitats are subtropical or tropical dry forests, subtropical or tropical moist lowland forests, subtropical or tropical moist shrubland, subtropical or tropical seasonally wet or flooded lowland grassland, rivers, intermittent rivers, freshwater lakes, intermittent freshwater lakes, freshwater marshes, intermittent freshwater marshes, arable land, pastureland, plantations, rural gardens, heavily degraded former forest, water storage areas, ponds, irrigated land, and seasonally flooded agricultural land. It is threatened by habitat loss.

== Range ==
Kaloula conjuncta occurs throughout the Philippines, and has been recorded on the islands of Negros, Panay, Guimaras, Cebu, Luzon, Polillo, Marinduque, Mindanao, Leyte, Patnanungan, Jomalig, Catanduanes, Tablas, Romblon, Sibuyan, and possibly Mindoro.

== Subspecies ==
There are currently 4 recognized subspecies of K. conjuncta (Inger 1954). Divergent varieties have been observed in Sibuyan, Eastern Visayas (Samar-Leyte), and Mindoro. The Sibuyan variety is most closely related to K. conjuncta negrosensis.

- K. conjuncta conjuncta: Luzon
- K. conjuncta negrosensis: Visayas
- K. conjuncta meridionalis: Mindanao (a small scansorial species with widely expanded digital disks)
- K. conjuncta stickeli: Samar (possibly a hybrid between K. picta and K. conjuncta meridionalis)
