= Kaloula indochinensis =

Conservation status
- Least Concern (IUCN 3.1)

Scientific classification
- Kingdom: Animalia
- Phylum: Chordata
- Class: Amphibia
- Order: Anura
- Family: Microhylidae
- Genus: Kaloula
- Species: K. indochinensis

Binomial name
- Kaloula indochinensis Chan, Blackburn, Murphy, Stuart, Emmett, Ho, and Brown, 2013

Species of amphibian

Kaloula indochinensis, commonly called the Indochinese brown bullfrog or simply Indochinese bullfrog is a species of frogs in the family Microhylidae. It is found in Indochina, in southern Vietnam, eastern Cambodia, and southern to central Laos. Prior to its being described, it was confused with Kaloula baleata.

== Description ==
Kaloula indochinensis are robust, medium-sized frogs. The males grow to a snout–vent length of 44–54 mm (1.7–2.1 in) and females to 39–54 mm (1.5–2.1 in). Tadpoles are not known. The dorsum in adults is chocolate to dark grayish-brown in colour and covered with fine white spots. There are orange-yellow patches on either side of the neck behind the eyes, and its skin is smooth but infused with low, rounded tubercles. The species resembles Kaloula baleata but differs from it by a number subtle characteristics: Kaloula indochinensis has larger finger discs, smaller inner metatarsal tubercles, only slightly raised inner and outer metatarsal tubercles, and 1–2 subarticular tubercles on fourth toe (vs. 3 in Kaloula baleata).

== Range ==
Kaloula indochinensis has been recorded in (Chan, et al. 2013):

- Krông Pa Village, K'Bang District, Gia Lai Province, Vietnam (type locality)
- An Khê District, Gia Lai Province, Vietnam
- Cát Tiên District, Lâm Đồng Province Vietnam
- Nakai District, Khammouan Province, Laos
- Ban Kiatngong, Champasak Province, Laos
- Phnom Prich Wildlife Sanctuary, Mondulkiri Province, Cambodia

== Habitat and behaviour ==
These frogs have mostly been found in small ephemeral ponds or beside temporary watercourses after heavy rains. Calling males, however, can climb on stones and to trees as high as 2 m (6 ft 7 in) above ground. Amplexus occurs in leaf litter. One specimen has been seen climbing bamboo at the transition of deciduous and lowland evergreen forest. They are active during night.
