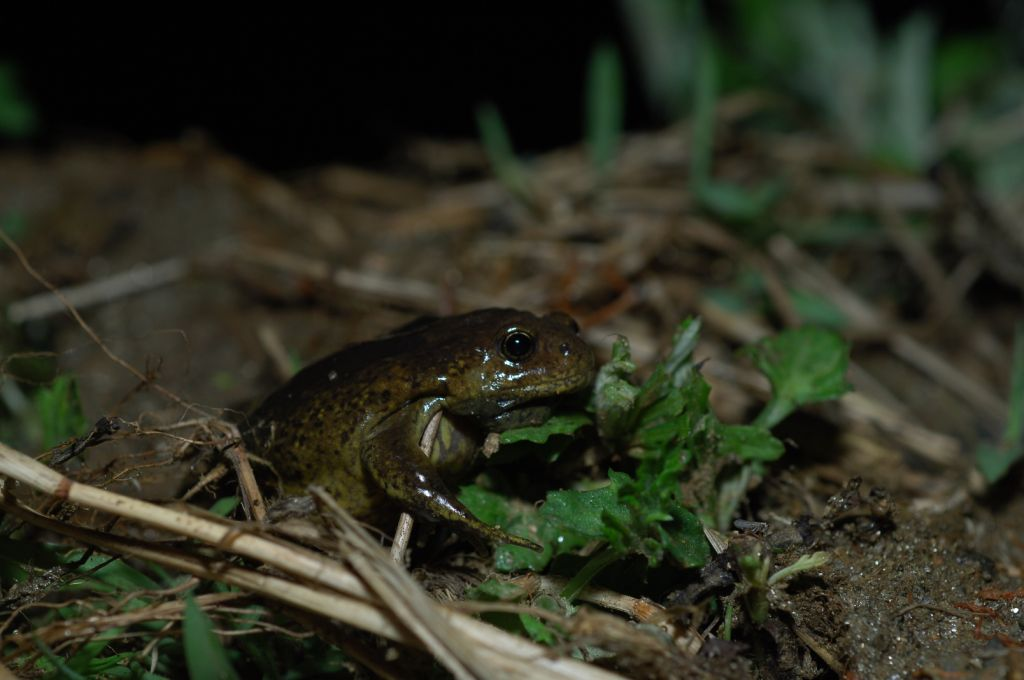

Conservation status
- Least Concern (IUCN 3.1)

Scientific classification
- Kingdom: Animalia
- Phylum: Chordata
- Class: Amphibia
- Order: Anura
- Family: Microhylidae
- Genus: Kaloula
- Species: K. borealis

Binomial name
- Kaloula borealis (Barbour, 1908)

= Boreal digging frog =

Species of amphibian

The boreal digging frog (Kaloula borealis) is a species of microhylid, or "narrow-mouthed," frog found in Northeast Asia. Its range covers much of central and northeastern China, the Korean Peninsula, and Jeju Island. Adult boreal digging frogs are roughly 4.5 cm in length, round in shape with toad-like speckled skin. Tadpoles are up to 35 mm (1.4 in) in length.

The boreal digging frog is common across much of its range, but is listed as an "Endangered category II species" in South Korea. It inhabits cultivated fields, including rice paddies, and is often found in close proximity to humanity, at altitudes of 10 to 900 m.

Boreal digging frogs breed during the annual rainy season, around June and July. After the rainy season is over they dig burrows underground, emerging only at night to feed. The eggs are laid in batches of 15–20 in monsoonal pools, with the tadpoles maturing within 30 days, much faster than most other frogs in this area.
