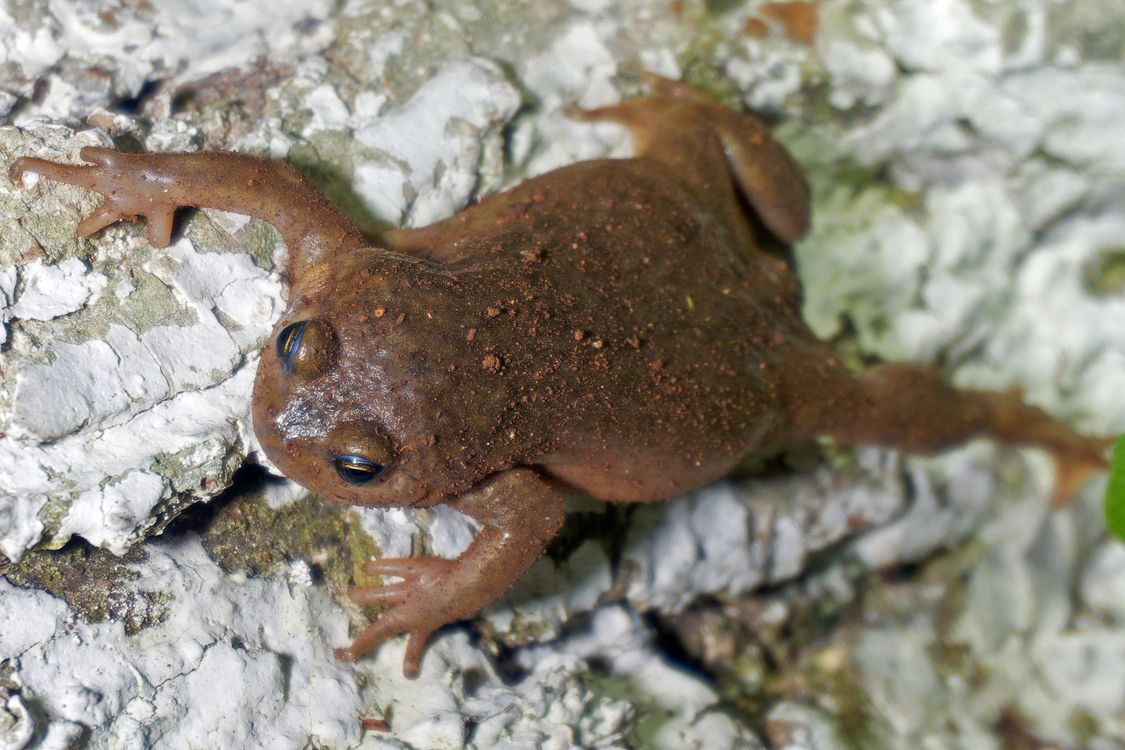

Conservation status
- Least Concern (IUCN 3.1)

Scientific classification
- Kingdom: Animalia
- Phylum: Chordata
- Class: Amphibia
- Order: Anura
- Family: Microhylidae
- Genus: Kaloula
- Species: K. verrucosa

Binomial name
- Kaloula verrucosa (Boulenger, 1904)

Synonyms
- Callula verrucosa Boulenger, 1904

= Kaloula verrucosa =

Verrucous digging frog

Species of amphibian

Kaloula verrucosa, the verrucous digging frog or Chinese narrowmouth toad, is a species of frog in the family Microhylidae. It is only known from the Yunnan–Guizhou Plateau of southwestern China in Sichuan, Yunnan, and Guizhou provinces, but it is expected to occur in adjacent Myanmar, Laos, and Vietnam. It is a very common species that lives in cultivated fields and in villages. Breeding takes place in temporary pools, ponds, and ditches.
