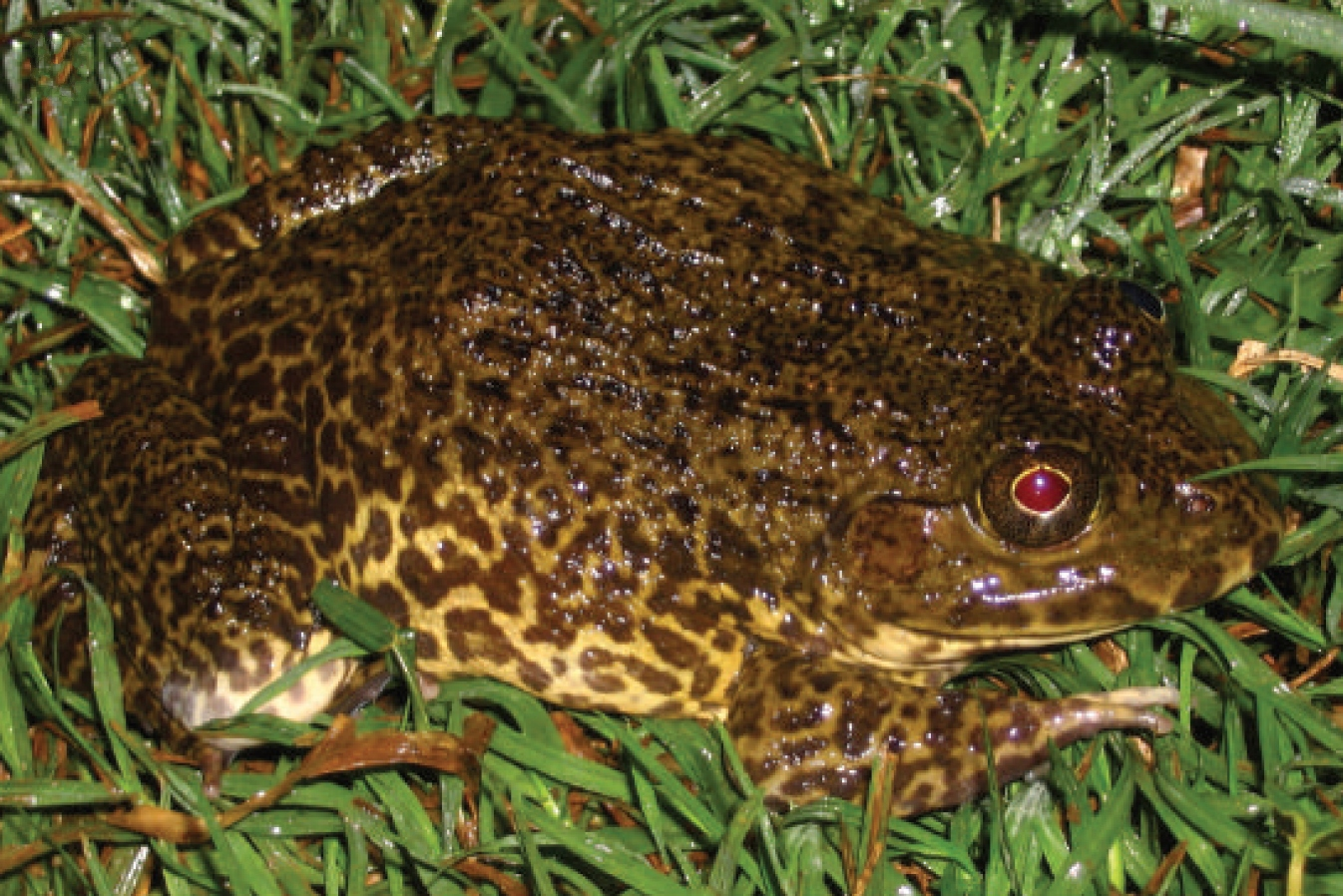

Conservation status
- Least Concern (IUCN 3.1)

Scientific classification
- Kingdom: Animalia
- Phylum: Chordata
- Class: Amphibia
- Order: Anura
- Family: Dicroglossidae
- Genus: Hoplobatrachus
- Species: H. chinensis

Binomial name
- Hoplobatrachus chinensis (Osbeck, 1765)

Synonyms
- Hoplobatrachus rugulosus (Wiegmann, 1834); Rana tigrina ssp. pantherina Steindachner, 1867

= Chinese edible frog =

Species of amphibian

The Chinese edible frog (Hoplobatrachus chinensis), also known as East Asian bullfrog and Taiwanese frog, is a species of frog in the family Dicroglossidae. It is found in Cambodia, China, Hong Kong, Laos, Macau, Malaysia, Myanmar, the Philippines, Singapore, Taiwan, Thailand, and Vietnam. Its natural habitats are freshwater marshes, intermittent freshwater marshes, arable land, pasture land, rural gardens, urban areas, ponds, aquaculture ponds, open excavations, irrigated land, seasonally flooded agricultural land, and canals and ditches. They breed in spring to early summer.

The domesticated Thai variety and wild Chinese populations of H. chinensis belong to two separate genetic lineages respectively. Yu et al. (2015) suggest that H. chinensis may in fact be a cryptic species complex.

== Description ==
H. chinensis is a large, robust frog, up to 12 centimetres (4 1/2 inches) or more in snout-vent length. Females are larger than males. They are primarily insectivores.

== Usage ==
The frogs are commonly found in wet markets, seafood markets, and pet stores. In wet markets, they are usually sold per piece or per kilogram. The medium-sized frogs are sold as pets in pet stores, and the smaller variant is sold as live food for arowanas or other predator fish. They are widely farmed in Sichuan, China, Malaysia, and Thailand.

These frogs, though much smaller than their Western counterparts, are used by Chinese to cook frog legs and by Filipinos who cook them for adobo dishes. The frog's forelimbs and hind legs are fried in oil, while in the adobo method (in which the entire frog is utilized), they are cooked in soy sauce and vinegar.
