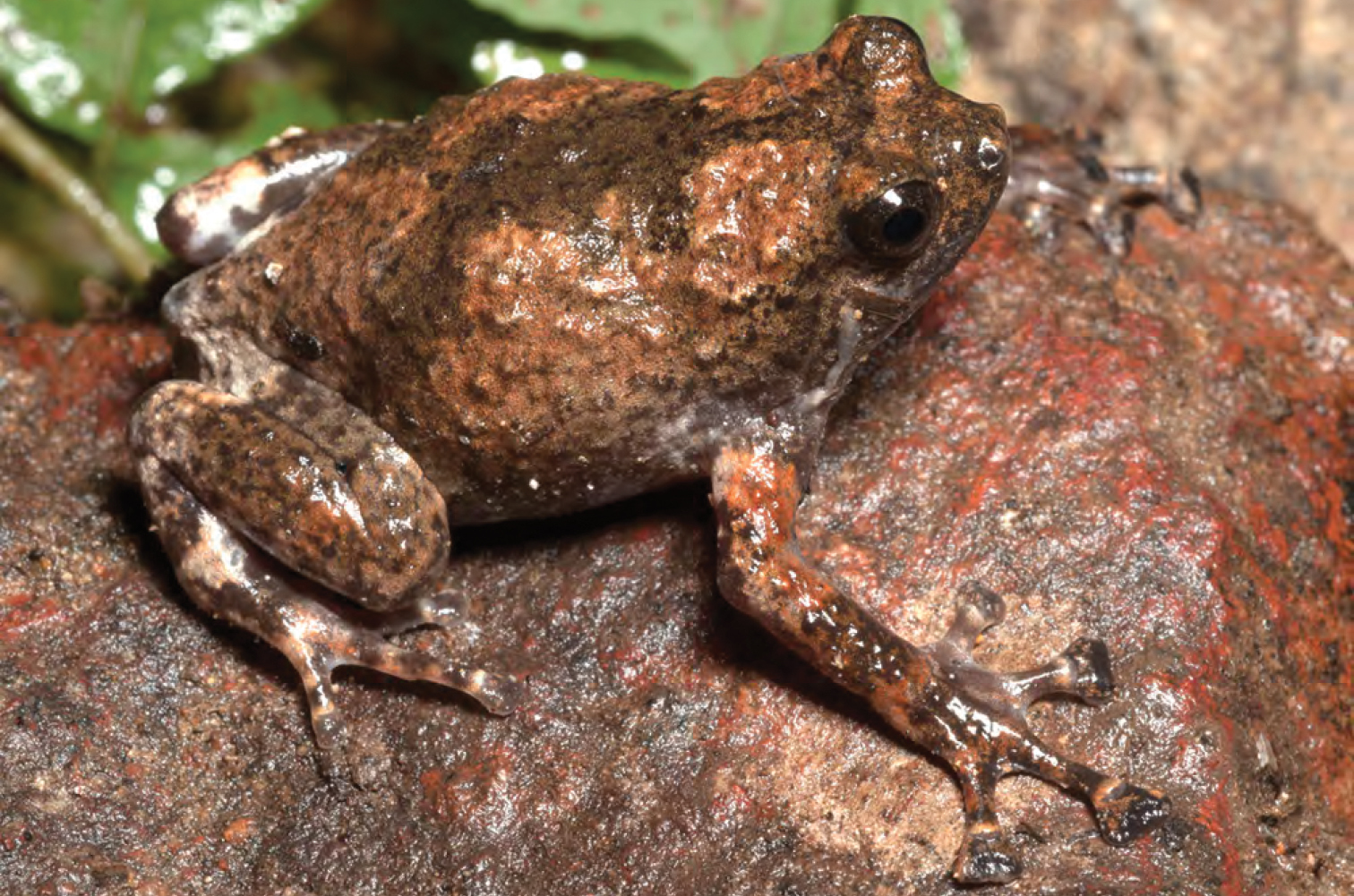

Conservation status
- Least Concern (IUCN 3.1)

Scientific classification
- Kingdom: Animalia
- Phylum: Chordata
- Class: Amphibia
- Order: Anura
- Family: Microhylidae
- Genus: Kaloula
- Species: K. kalingensis

Binomial name
- Kaloula kalingensis Taylor, 1922

= Kalinga narrowmouth toad =

Species of amphibian

The Kalinga narrowmouth toad (Kaloula kalingensis) is a species of frog in the family Microhylidae. It is endemic to the Philippines. Its natural habitats are subtropical or tropical moist lowland forests, subtropical or tropical moist montane forests, arable land, pastureland, and plantations. It is threatened by habitat loss.

== Description ==
The Kalinga narrowmouth toad is a plump frog with a rounded body and short head. It has a short, truncated snout, nostrils on the side of the head and easily discernible tympani. There are tubercles on the snout and face, on the back and on the flanks. The skin on the underparts is granular except for the chest which is smooth. The fingers have white tubercles underneath and small pads at the tips and the toes are slightly webbed. The snout-to-vent length is about 36 millimetres (1.4 in). The dorsal surface is bluish-black with reddish-brown markings on head, sides and limbs. The underparts are brown mottled with white.

== Distribution and habitat ==
This frog is endemic to the Philippines. It is known from the Cordillera Central Mountains on the island of Luzon and possibly from the Sierra Madres Mountains. It is also found on Polillo Island and Palaui Island. Its habitat is lowland or lower mountain rainforests and their fringes where it is largely found on the forest floor and in rain-filled holes in trees and other temporary water bodies. In the breeding season, males call from holes in trees and other locations several metres off the forest floor and from under logs. The call is a loud, slightly undulating, trill which has been described as "Bwop!".

Divergent varieties that may turn out to be new species (Kaloula sp. nov.) have been found in Panay (Sibalom Natural Park) and eastern Luzon.

== Status ==
Its total range is smaller than 20,000 square kilometres (7,700 sq mi) and within that range its populations are fragmented. The major threats it faces are the degradation of its forest habitat but it is unknown whether the total numbers of individuals is in decline or not.
