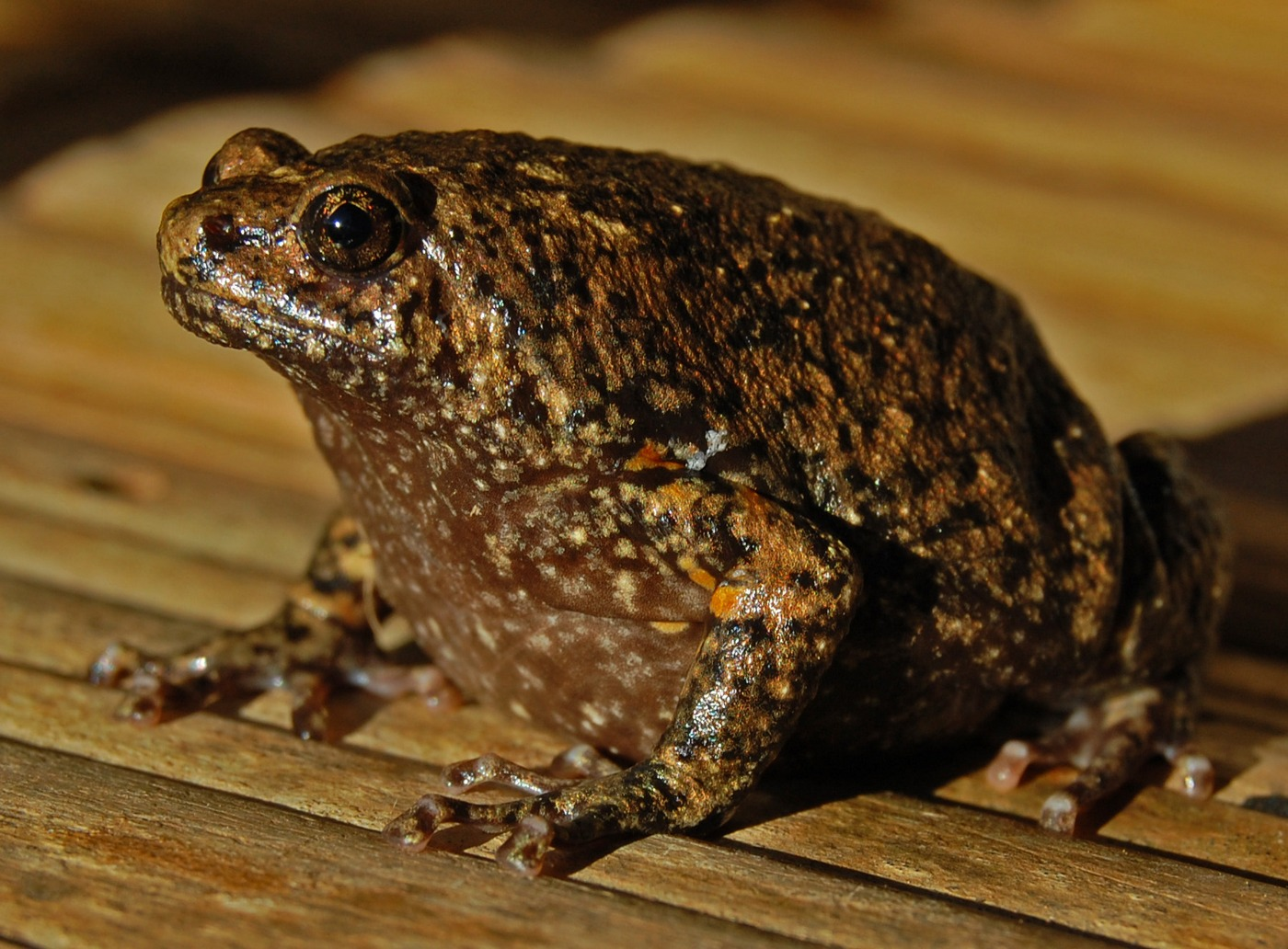

Conservation status
- Least Concern (IUCN 3.1)

Scientific classification
- Kingdom: Animalia
- Phylum: Chordata
- Class: Amphibia
- Order: Anura
- Family: Microhylidae
- Genus: Kaloula
- Species: K. baleata

Binomial name
- Kaloula baleata (Müller In Oort and Müller, 1833)

= Kaloula baleata =

Species of amphibian

Kaloula baleata, the flower pot toad or sometimes the smooth-fingered narrow-mouthed frog, is a species of narrow-mouthed toad. It is native to India, Borneo, Indochinese Peninsula, Java, Malay Peninsula and Philippines where it lives in lowland rainforests and is tolerant of disturbed sites. The IUCN lists it as being of "Least Concern".

== Description ==
The smooth-fingered narrow-mouthed frog is a stout animal with a rounded body. Females average a snout-to-vent length of 65 millimetres (2.6 in) and males are a little smaller. The hind limbs are short and the digits of the hands have spoon-shaped tips while the toes are webbed. The colour is dark brown but many white-tipped tubercles give it a rough, speckled appearance. In individuals from Java, there is a brick red spot in the groin region whereas other populations have a yellow spot in this location.

== Distribution and habitat ==
This frog is native to the mainland of Malaysia, Borneo, Sumatra, Nusa Tenggara, Sulawesi, southern Thailand, and the Philippines. Its habitat is primary and secondary rainforest up to an altitude of about 800 metres (2,600 ft) and it can tolerate some disturbance of its environment. It also occurs on flood plains.

Divergent varieties that may turn out to be new species have been found in Palawan and Sulawesi. These include:

- Kaloula sp. nov. Palawan: Recorded in Palawan.
- Kaloula sp. nov. Sulawesi: Recorded in the Togian Islands (Batudaka Island), Central Sulawesi, and North Sulawesi (Bogani Nani Wartabone National Park).

The subspecies K. baleata goshi has been reported from Little Andaman and South Andaman Islands (Das & Dutta 1998).

== Behaviour ==
This frog is a fossorial species and lives among the leaf litter but can also climb into trees up to 6 metres (20 ft) above the forest floor. It is an explosive breeder and with many individuals breeding as soon as the rainy season starts. The tadpoles do not feed and undergo metamorphosis into juvenile frogs after about two weeks of development. In the Andaman Islands this frog is said to breed in holes in trees.

== Status ==
This frog has a wide range and the population seems to be reasonably stable, the IUCN rates it as being of "Least Concern" as it considers that the rate of decline, if any, is insufficient to justify listing it in a more threatened category. It is common in some parts of its range and no particular threats to this species have been identified apart from some degradation of its forest habitat.
