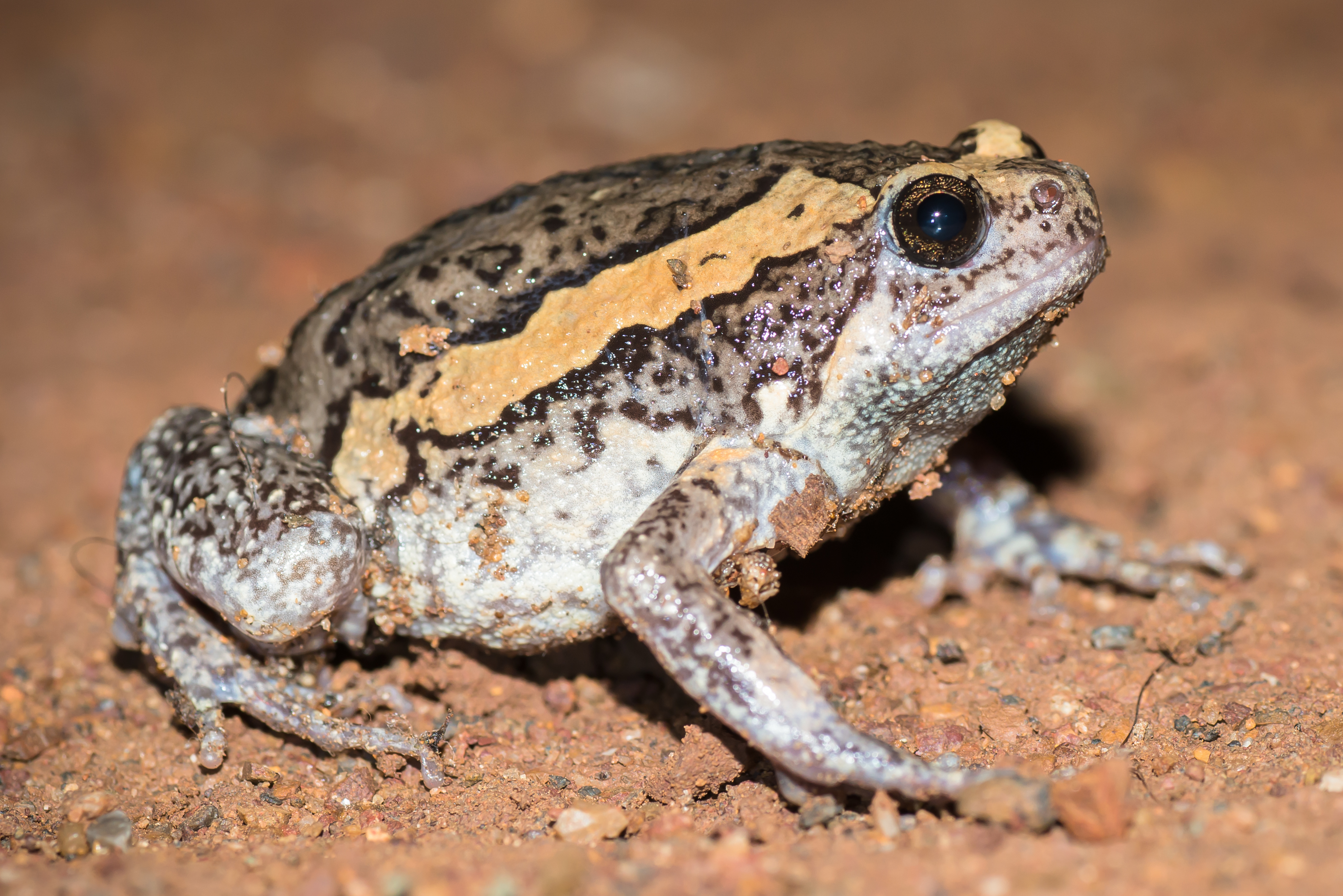

Conservation status
- Least Concern (IUCN 3.1)

Scientific classification
- Kingdom: Animalia
- Phylum: Chordata
- Class: Amphibia
- Order: Anura
- Family: Microhylidae
- Genus: Kaloula
- Species: K. pulchra

Binomial name
- Kaloula pulchra (Gray, 1831)
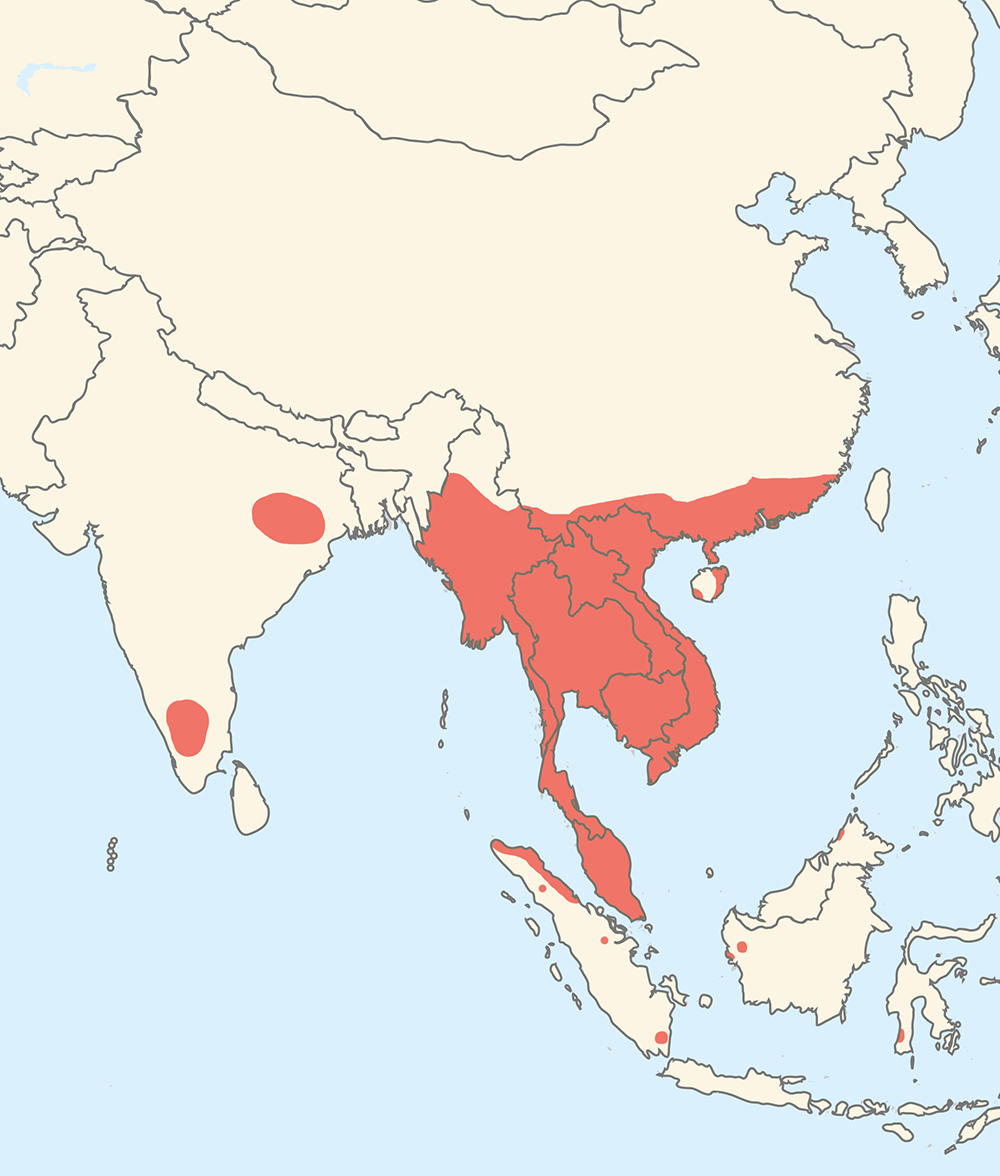
- Banded bullfrog range

Audio
- Calls of several banded bullfrogs

= Banded bullfrog =

Species of frog

The banded bullfrog (Kaloula pulchra) is a species of frog in the narrow-mouthed frog family Microhylidae. Native to Southeast Asia, it is also known as the Asian painted frog, digging frog, Malaysian bullfrog, common Asian frog, and painted balloon frog. In the pet trade, it is sometimes called the chubby frog. Adults measure 5.4 to 7.5 cm (2.1 to 3.0 in) and have a dark brown back with stripes that vary from copper-brown to salmon pink.

The banded bullfrog lives at low altitudes and is found in both urban and rural settings, as well as in forest habitats. They bury themselves underground during dry periods and emerge after heavy rainfall to emit calls and breed. They feed primarily on ants and termites; predators of adults and tadpoles include snakes, dragonfly larvae, and snails. When threatened, they inflate their lungs and secrete a noxious white substance. The species is prevalent in the pet trade and is a potential invasive species being introduced in Taiwan, the Philippines, Guam, Singapore, Borneo, and Sulawesi.

== Taxonomy and etymology ==
The banded bullfrog was first described in 1831 by the British zoologist John Edward Gray, as Kaloula pulchra (pulchra meaning "beautiful" in Latin). Cantor (1847) described the species under the name Hylaedactylus bivittatus, which was synonymized with K. pulchra by Günther (1858). The subspecies K. p. hainana was described by Gressitt (1938) as having a shorter snout and hind legs compared to the nominate subspecies, K. p. pulchra. A former subspecies in Sri Lanka, originally named K. p. taprobanica by Parker (1934), has since been reclassified as a separate species, Uperodon taprobanicus. Bourret (1942) described a subspecies K. p. macrocephala that is now considered by several authors to be a distinct species, K. macrocephala.

According to Darrel Frost's Amphibian Species of the World, common names for Kaloula pulchra include the Malaysian narrowmouth toad, Asian painted frog, digging frog, painted bullfrog, Malaysian bullfrog, painted burrowing frog, common Asian bullfrog, painted balloon frog, and painted microhylid frog. It is also known as the chubby frog in the pet trade.

== Description ==
The banded bullfrog is medium-sized with a stocky, triangular body and a short snout. Males grow to a snout–vent length (SVL) of 5.4 to 7.0 cm (2.1 to 2.8 in) and females are slightly larger, reaching an SVL of 5.7 to 7.5 cm (2.2 to 3.0 in). Other than the slight difference in length, there is very limited sexual dimorphism. They have a body weight of 80–120 g (2.8–4.2 oz). The back is dark brown with stripes that vary from copper-brown to salmon pink, and the abdomen is cream-colored.

Tadpoles are about 0.5 cm (0.20 in) long after hatching and reach an SVL of about 1.1 cm (0.43 in) at the end of metamorphosis. They have an oval body that is brown or black with a pale belly, a round snout, and a moderately long, tapered tail with yellow speckles and tall fins. The eyes are relatively small and the side of the head, with black or dark gray irises and a golden ring around the pupil. They do not possess any tail filament. During metamorphosis, their eyes increase in size and bulge and they develop slender limbs and digits with rounded tips. The tadpoles metamorphose beginning at two weeks.

== Distribution and habitat ==
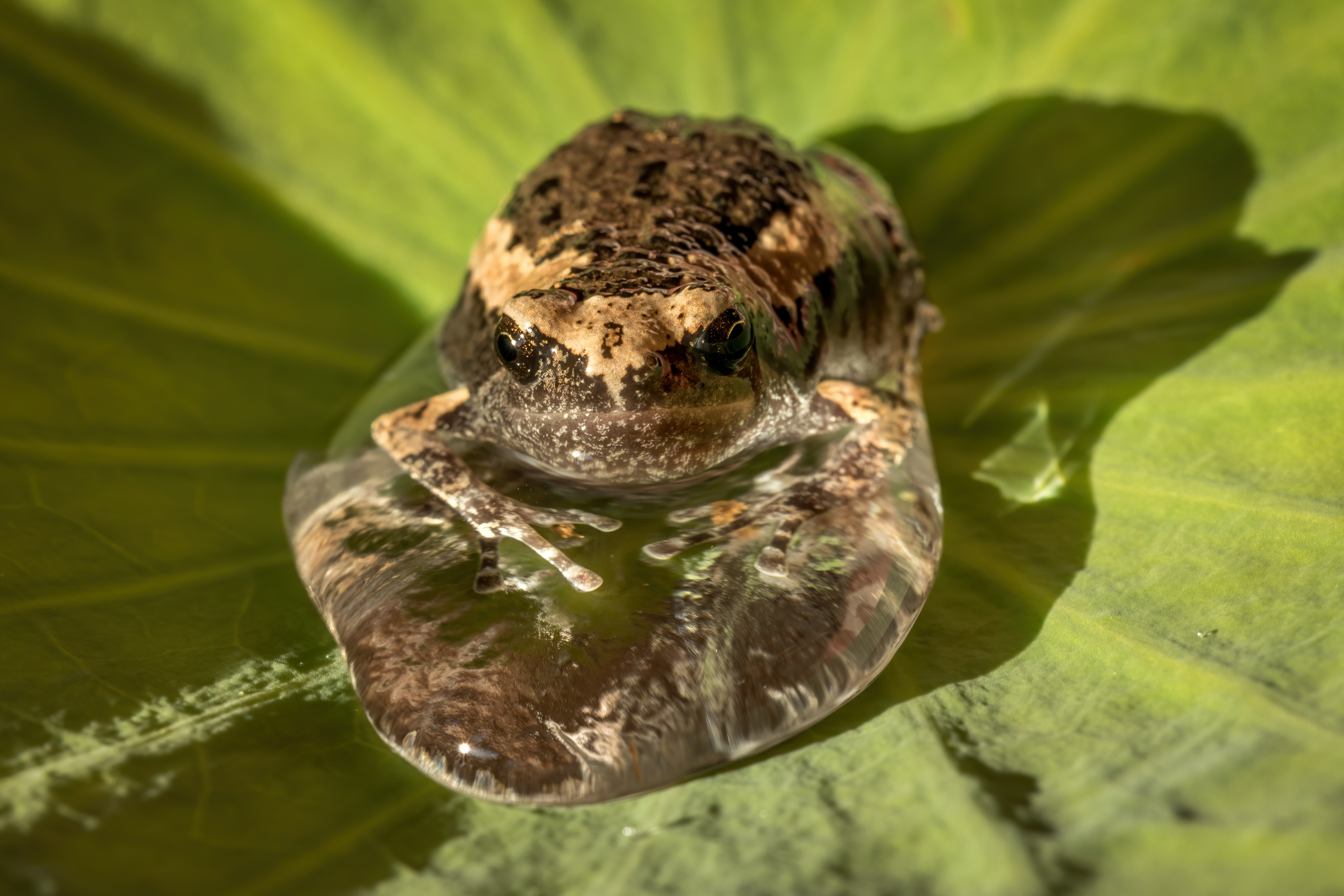
Juvenile banded bullfrog in a drop of water on a sacred lotus leaf, in Laos

The species is native to Southeast Asia. It is common over a range from northeastern India, and Nepal, to southern India and Sri Lanka to southern China (especially Hainan) and Myanmar, and south to the islands of maritime Southeast Asia. Its wide distribution, compared to the related species Kaloula assamensis, has been attributed to its burrowing ability.

The banded bullfrog has been found at elevations between sea level and 750 m (2,460 ft) above sea level. It can occur in both urban and rural settings, and in forest habitats.

=== As an invasive species ===
The banded bullfrog is a potential invasive species. It has been introduced through both the pet trade and maritime transport, and has become established in Taiwan, the Philippines, Guam, Singapore, Borneo, and Sulawesi. Some specimens have been observed in Australia and New Zealand. Its introduction into the Philippines was likely accidental, via contamination of plant nursery materials or stowaways on ships and boats.

Several species, likely introduced through the pet trade, were observed in Florida in 2006 and 2008; however, as of 2011, the population is under control and there is no evidence of reproduction. The frog was observed at an airport in Perth, Australia, and at a cargo port in New Zealand, but no established invasive population has been found in either country as of 2019.

== Behaviour and ecology ==
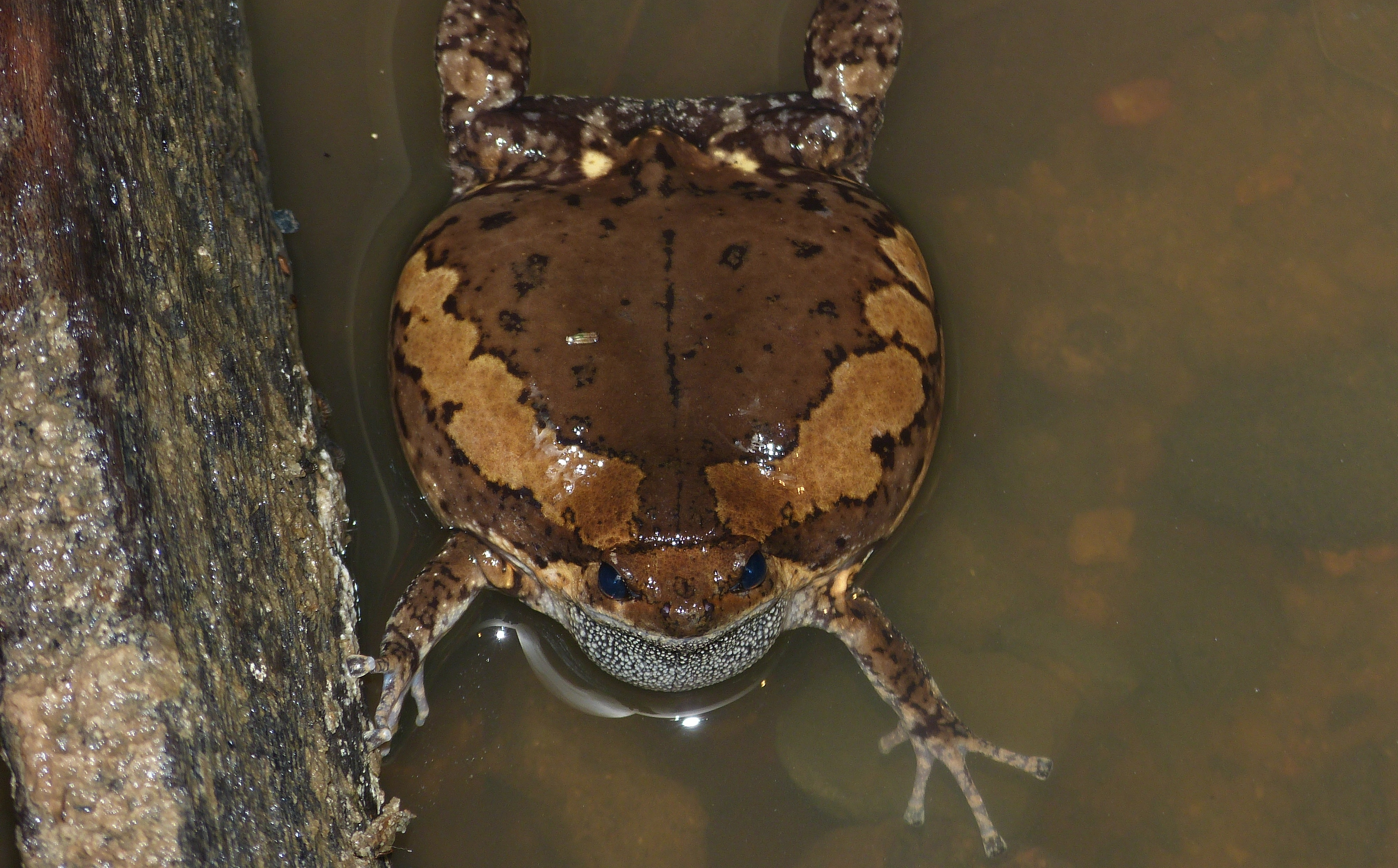
Banded bullfrogs are capable swimmers.

Breeding is stimulated by heavy monsoon rains, after which the frogs relocate from underground to rain pools or ponds. They are more commonly found on wetter nights, and while they are not reproductively active during dry periods, their gonads remain ripe so that they can mate soon after rainfall. In India, the male frogs call after the monsoon season begins in April or May. The pulses of the calls recorded in India were 28–56 per second with a frequency range of 50–1760 Hz. In Thailand the dominant frequency was 250 Hz (duration 560–600 ms long) and 18–21 pulses per call.

Their form is suited for walking and burrowing rather than jumping. They are able to survive dry conditions by burying themselves in the ground and waiting for rain; the burrowing also helps them avoid predators. When burrowing they dig their way down hindlimb first and use their forelimbs to push themselves several inches under the soil, where they can remain for the duration of the dry season. Banded bullfrogs hide under leaf litter during the daylight hours and eat in the evening. They have been found in trees and have been observed hunting termites in them.

=== Diet, predators, and parasites ===
In the wild, the banded bullfrog primarily eats ants and termites. It also feeds on other small invertebrates including flies, crickets, moths, grasshoppers, and earthworms. Its relatively small head and mouth mostly limit its diet to small and slow-moving prey. The feeding cycle from opening of the mouth to closing is about 150 milliseconds and is relatively symmetrical, meaning that the bullfrog spends an equal amount of time extending its tongue and bringing the prey into the mouth. Banded bullfrogs kept as pets can be fed insects such as crickets, mealworms, insect larvae, and beetles.

Snakes such as the Taiwan kukri snake and the small-banded kukri snake are predators of adult banded bullfrogs. For eggs and tadpoles, predators include dragonfly larvae and snails such as the golden apple snail. Banded bullfrogs display deimatic behaviour when threatened, greatly inflating their bodies in an attempt to distract or startle predators. By inflating its body and bending its head down, the bullfrog can appear larger than its actual size. It also secretes a noxious white substance through its skin that is distasteful, though non-toxic, to predators. The secretion contains a trypsin inhibitor and can induce hemolysis (rupturing of red blood cells).

Parasites include parasitic worms that have been found in the frog's intestinal mesentery and leeches that attach to the frog's back.

== Pet trade ==
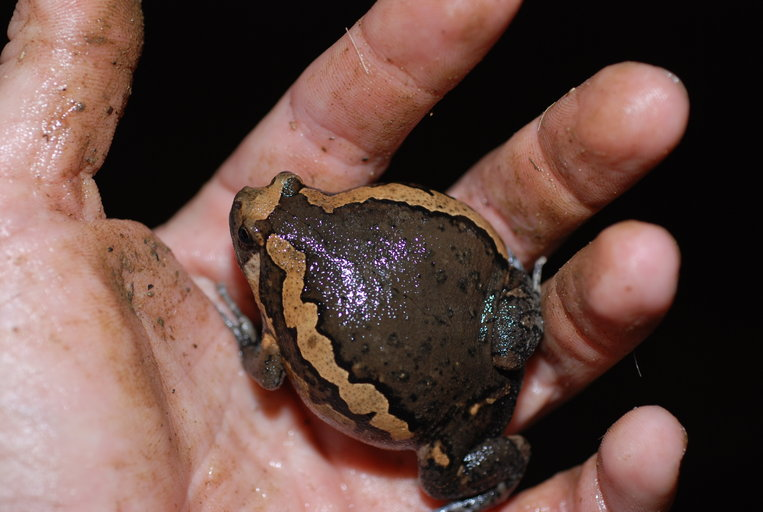
An inflated banded bullfrog

Commonly sold in pet stores, banded bullfrogs thrive in terrariums with substrate choices consisting of peat–soil mixes or moss mixtures. In contrast to the ant and termite diets of wild bullfrogs, captive bullfrogs typically feed on slightly larger insects such as crickets or mealworms.

A survey of internet pet trade listings between 2015 and 2018 in Europe and the United States found that there were three to four times as many offers as requests for the banded bullfrog, with no evidence of captive breeding. In the Philippines, traders collect the frogs locally. Low interest in the Philippine pet trade has been attributed to the bullfrog's muted colours and burrowing behavior. Máximo and colleagues hypothesize that the species has been illegally sold in South America for decades, based on identifications in Argentina during the 1980s and in Brazil in 2020.

== Conservation status ==
The International Union for Conservation of Nature listed the species as least concern due to its extensive distribution, tolerance of a wide range of environments, and predicted large population. In many regions, the banded bullfrog is captured for consumption, but this does not appear to have a substantial impact on its population.
