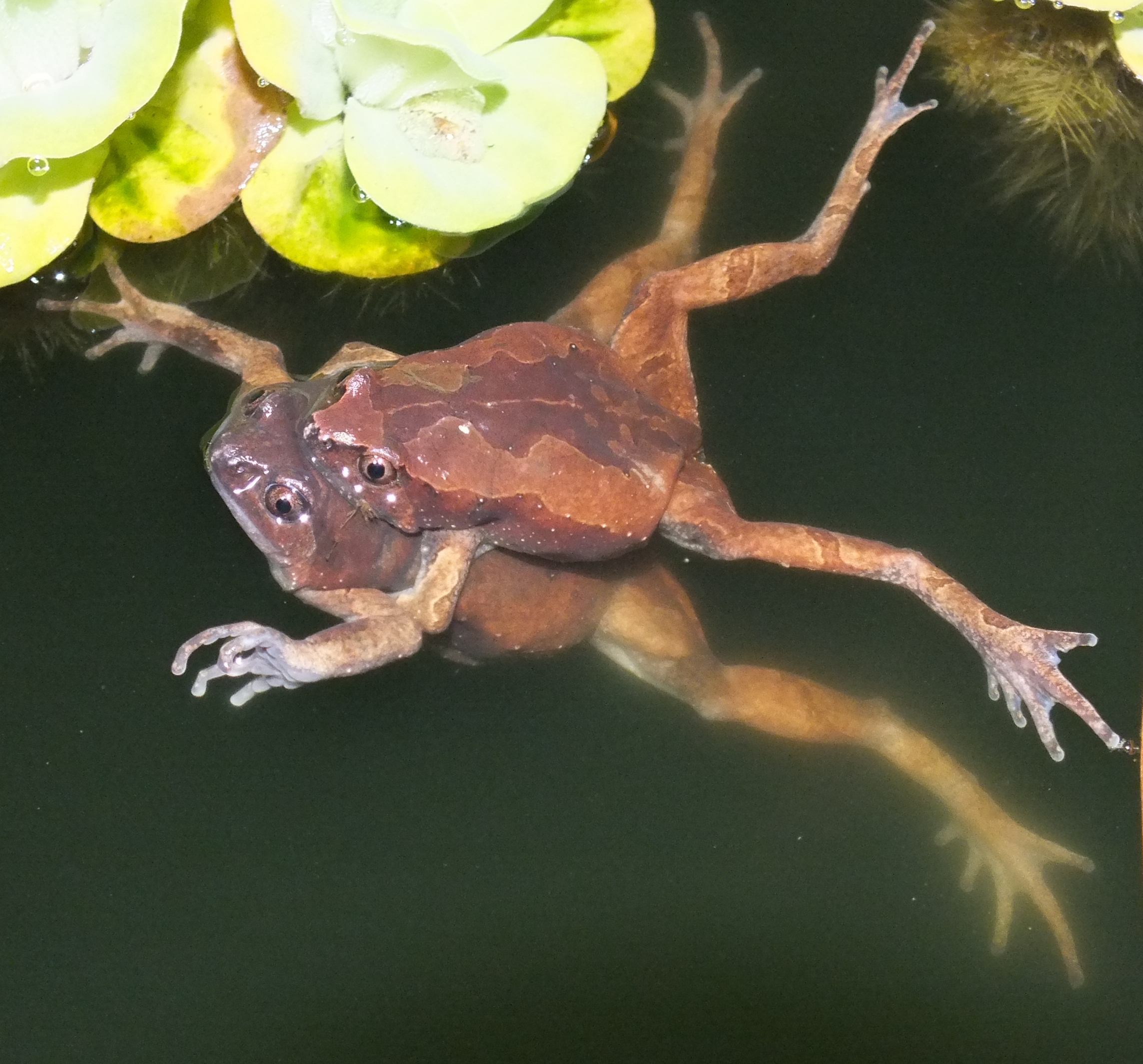

Conservation status
- Least Concern (IUCN 3.1)

Scientific classification
- Kingdom: Animalia
- Phylum: Chordata
- Class: Amphibia
- Order: Anura
- Family: Microhylidae
- Genus: Kaloula
- Species: K. rigida

Binomial name
- Kaloula rigida Taylor, 1922

= Luzon narrow-mouthed frog =

Species of frog

The Luzon narrow-mouthed frog (Kaloula rigida) is a species of frogs in the family Microhylidae.

It is endemic to the Central Cordilleras and Sierra Madres of northern Luzon, Philippines.

The Baguio variety is divergent from the rest of the population found in the forested mountains of northern Luzon.

== Habitat ==
Its natural habitats are subtropical or tropical dry forests, subtropical or tropical moist lowland forests, subtropical or tropical moist montane forests, subtropical or tropical moist shrubland, subtropical or tropical seasonally wet or flooded lowland grassland, rivers, intermittent rivers, arable land, rural gardens, urban areas, irrigated land, and seasonally flooded agricultural land. It is threatened by habitat loss.

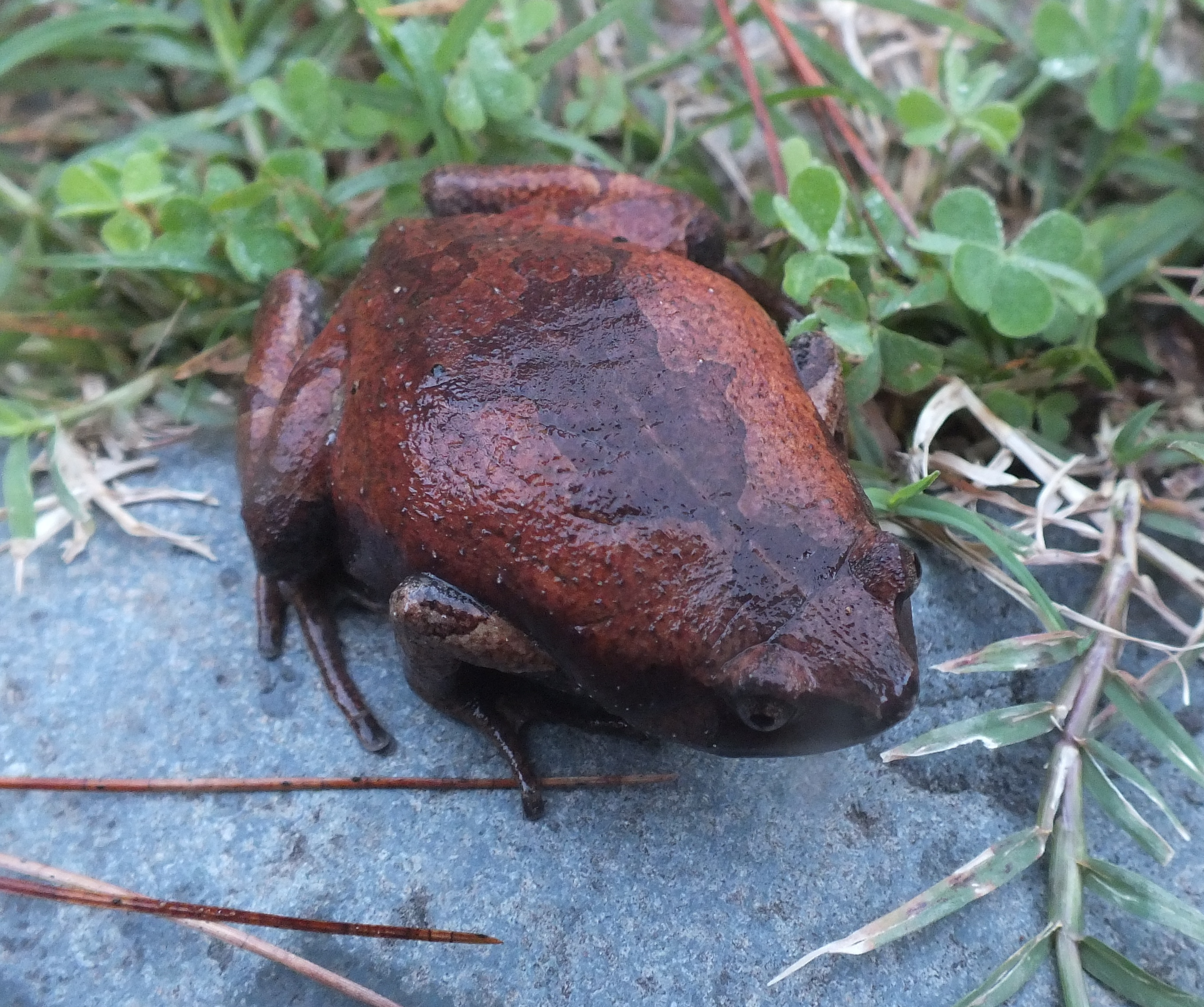
A Luzon narrow-mouthed frog in the Philippines
