= Kaloula assamensis =

Conservation status
- Least Concern (IUCN 3.1)

Scientific classification
- Kingdom: Animalia
- Phylum: Chordata
- Class: Amphibia
- Order: Anura
- Family: Microhylidae
- Genus: Kaloula
- Species: K. assamensis

Binomial name
- Kaloula assamensis Das, Sengupta, Ahmed and Dutta, 2005

Species of amphibian

Kaloula assamensis, also known as Assamese balloon frog or Assam narrow-mouth toad, is a species of narrow-mouthed frogs found in Assam, Arunachal Pradesh, and West Bengal in northeastern India.

== Range ==
In Sonitpur District, Assam, Kaloula assamensis was recorded in Majbat, Nameri National Park, and Orang National Park. It was also found in Bongaigaon, western Assam; Pakhui Wildlife Sanctuary, East Kameng District, Arunachal Pradesh; and Bong Basti village, Chilapata Range, West Bengal. It may also be found in southern Bhutan.
