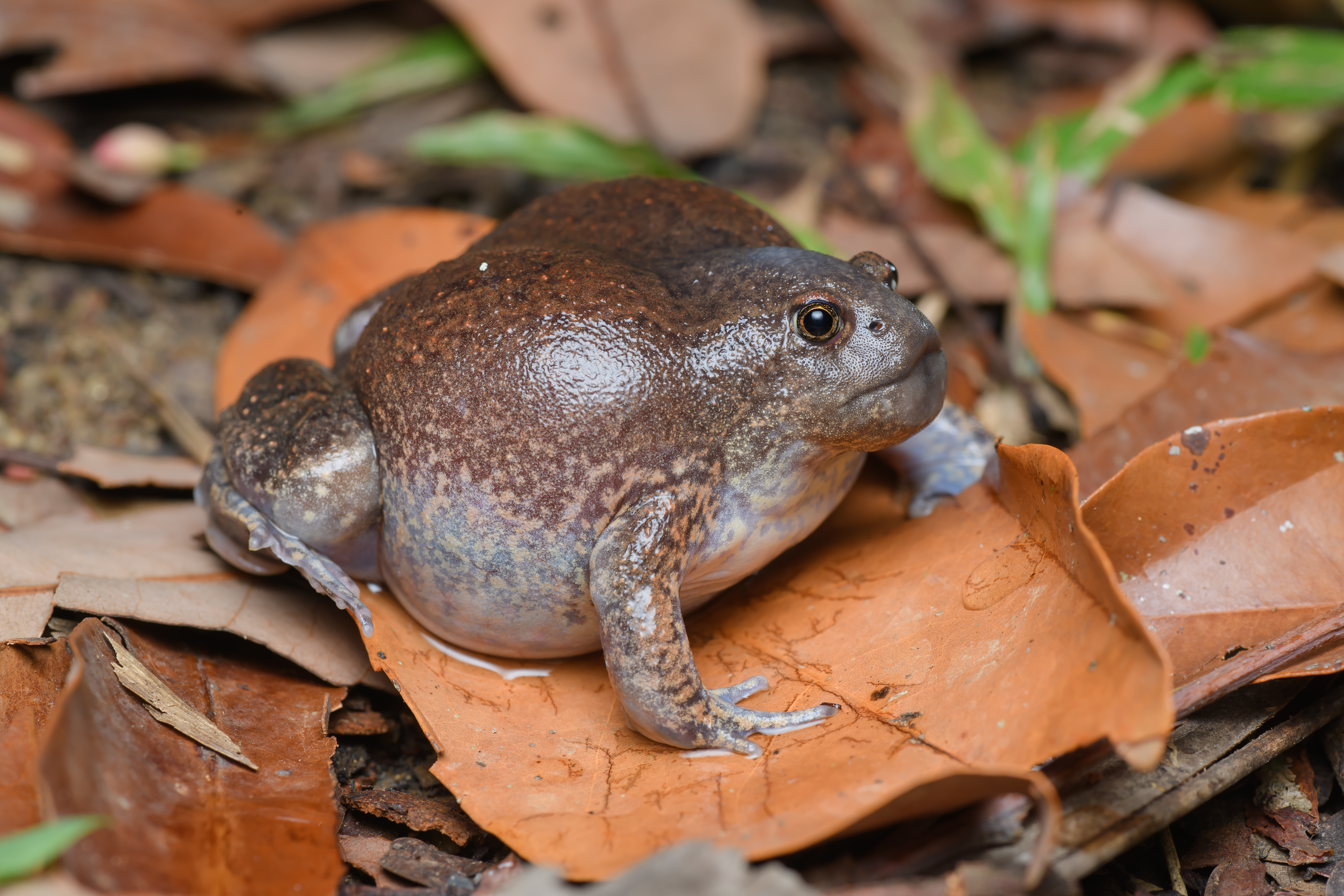

Conservation status
- Near Threatened (IUCN 3.1)

Scientific classification
- Kingdom: Animalia
- Phylum: Chordata
- Class: Amphibia
- Order: Anura
- Family: Microhylidae
- Genus: Glyphoglossus
- Species: G. molossus

Binomial name
- Glyphoglossus molossus Günther, 1868

= Glyphoglossus molossus =

Species of amphibian

Glyphoglossus molossus is a species of frog in the family Microhylidae. Its common names include blunt-headed burrowing frog and balloon frog.

== Distribution and habitat ==
Glyphoglossus molossus is found in Cambodia, Laos, Myanmar, Thailand, and Vietnam. Its natural habitat is subtropical or tropical seasonal forests, moist savanna, intermittent freshwater marshes, rural gardens, temporary ponds, and heavily degraded former forest.

== Breeding biology ==
These large, burrowing frogs follow the general theme of microhylids that deposit aquatic eggs over and over. There is explosive breeding activity in ephemeral water sources such as ponds and ditches. The frogs perform multiple symplectic dips to oviposit the surface films of pigmented eggs. A portion of a clutch is released with each dip, with a dip lasting for about 6 seconds. 200–300 eggs are released per dip. The ova have a dark black animal pole and a yellow vegetal pole. Tadpoles feed by filtering suspended material in the water column.

== Status ==
Glyphoglossus molossus is threatened by over-harvesting (see below) and habitat loss.

== As food ==
In certain areas, this frog is collected in large numbers as food during the breeding season.

The balloon frog is very popular as a food item in Thailand, where it has been traditionally considered a delicacy in Thai cuisine, the frog's texture and taste reputedly being so exquisite that it can be eaten whole. Natural populations of this amphibian, however, have been severely depleted in most areas of the country owing to overcatching. Currently, projects are undertaken to breed and release these frogs into their natural habitat. The first place where breeding was undertaken at Phayao Inland Fisheries Research and Development Center in 2009. Later breeding was undertaken at Lamphun Inland Fisheries and Development Center in 2011.

== See also ==
- List of Thai ingredients
