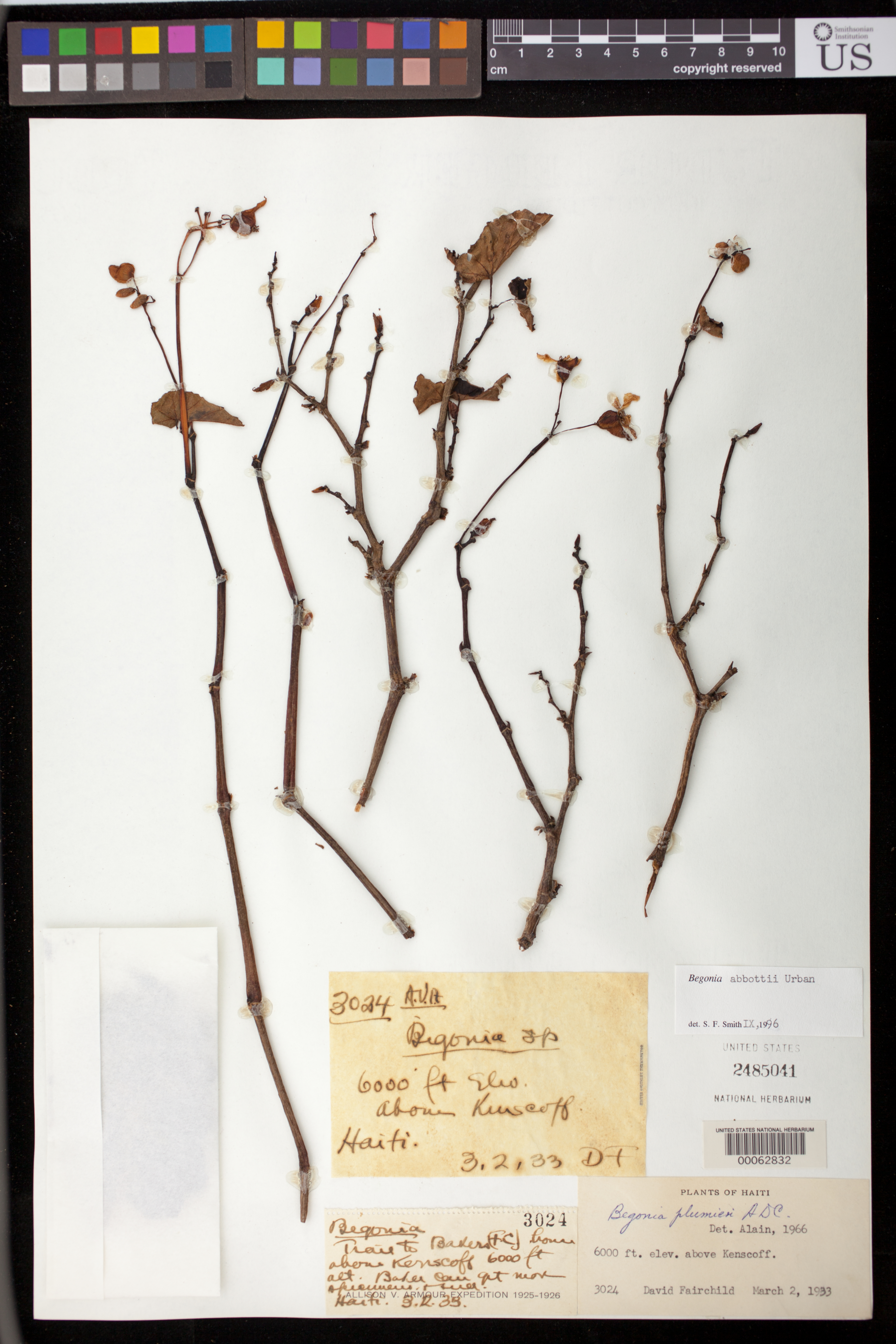
- Begonia abbottii (herbarium specimen) collected by David Fairchild in Massif de la Selle, Haiti.

Scientific classification
- Kingdom: Plantae
- Clade: Tracheophytes
- Clade: Angiosperms
- Clade: Eudicots
- Clade: Rosids
- Order: Cucurbitales
- Family: Begoniaceae
- Genus: Begonia
- Species: B. abbottii

Binomial name
- Begonia abbottii Urban, 1922

= Begonia abbottii =

Species of plant

Begonia abbottii is a species of flowering plant in the family Begoniaceae. It is endemic to Haiti, where it is restricted to the mountains near Furcy in Chaîne de la Selle .

The species was collected in 1920 during the third and final leg of the Smithsonian Institution's "Botanical Explorations of Haiti" expedition, led by American naturalist William Louis Abbott with botanist Emery Clarence Leonard joining as plant collector. It was formally described in 1922 by the German botanist Ignaz Urban.

== Taxonomy ==
The species was collected on 26 May 1920 near springs at Furcy, a mountain village about 50 km south of Port-au-Prince, during the Smithsonian "Botanical Explorations of Haiti." The series consisted of three trips (1919–1920) aimed at collecting mammals, birds, and plants for the United States National Museum. On the third and final trip (February–July 1920) Abbott was accompanied by botanist Emery Clarence Leonard (USNM, Division of Plants), who was responsible for the plant collections.

Urban described the species in 1922 in Repertorium specierum novarum regni vegetabilis. He placed it in Begonia sect. Begonia.

The species was reportedly rediscovered on 2 March 1933 by American plant explorer David Fairchild.

== Etymology ==
The specific epithet, abbottii, commemorates William Louis Abbott (1860–1936), whose expeditions in Hispaniola supported the Smithsonian's collections and during which the type material was gathered.

The generic name Begonia was coined in 1690 by French botanist Charles Plumier in honor of Michel Bégon (1638–1710), then governor of Haiti and patron of botany. With more than 1,900 accepted species, Begonia is one of the largest genera of flowering plants, distributed pantropically.

== Description ==
Urban's protologue provides the original diagnosis:

Caulis erectus, ramosus. Stipulae ovatae, acuminatae. Folia petiolata, petiolis 7–10 mm longis; lamina ovato-elliptica vel ovato-lanceolata, margine inaequaliter crenata. Inflorescentiae floribus albis purpureo-rubricantibus mense Maio–Junio.

Translated:

Shrub with erect, branching stems. Stipules ovate and acuminate. Leaves borne on petioles 7–10 mm long; blades ovate-elliptic to ovate-lanceolate, with irregularly crenate margins. Inflorescences in May–June, with white flowers tinged with purplish red.

These characters distinguish B. abbottii from related Hispaniolan species such as B. domingensis.

== Distribution and habitat ==
Begonia abbottii is endemic to Haiti, with records restricted to the Furcy area of the La Selle Mountains. It grows near springs and shaded mountain slopes.

The species has not been recorded in cultivation and does not appear in the collections of major botanical gardens.

== Conservation ==
Begonia abbottii has not been assessed for the IUCN Red List. However, its very restricted range (extent of occurrence <100 km²), occurrence at a single locality, and continuing decline in habitat quality due to deforestation suggest that it would likely qualify as Endangered under IUCN criteria B1ab(iii).

Secondary accounts emphasize the ongoing threat posed by deforestation in Haiti's montane ecosystems. The American Begonia Society notes that many species of Begonia not yet formally evaluated by IUCN are nonetheless vulnerable because of habitat loss and narrow ranges.
