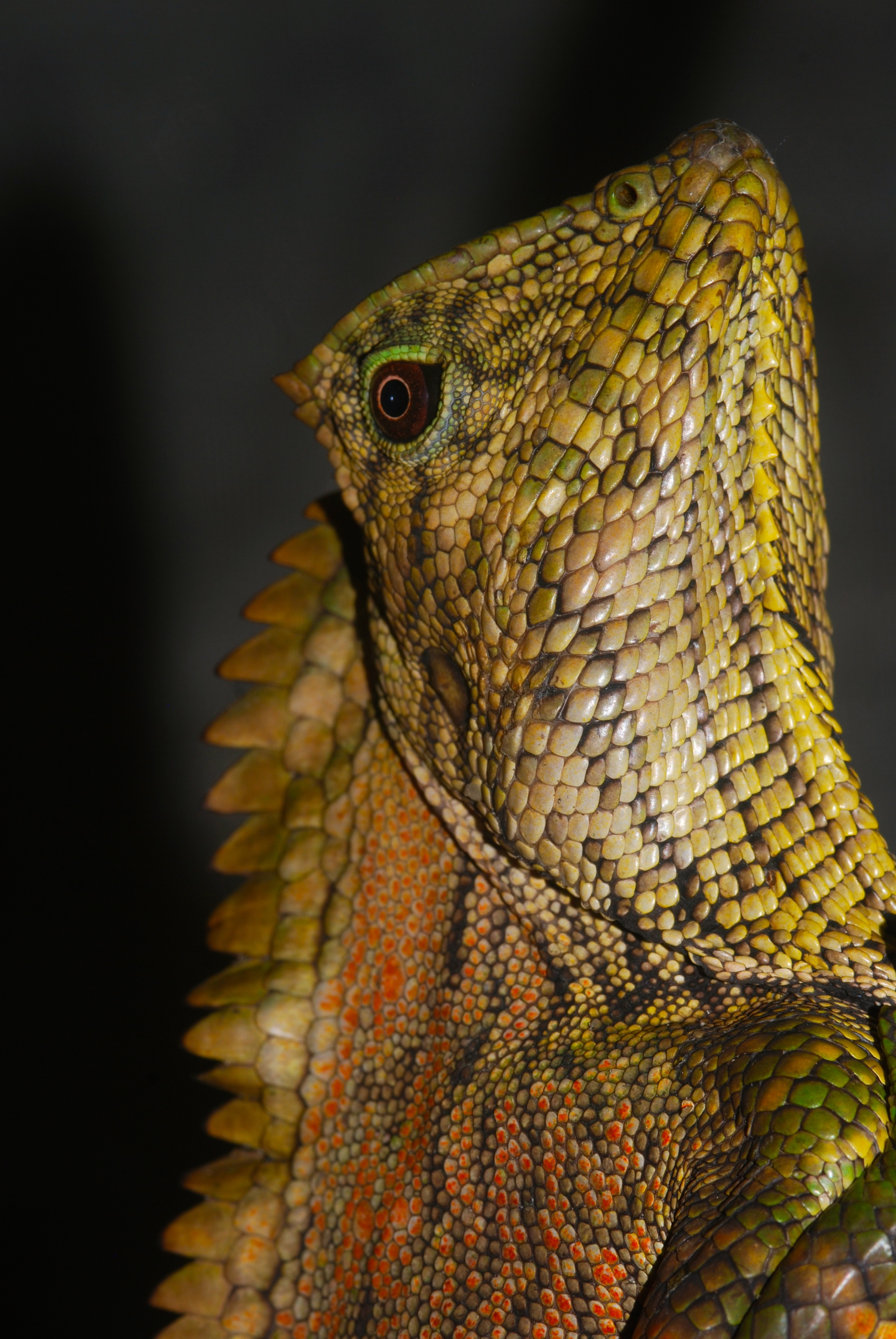
- Male
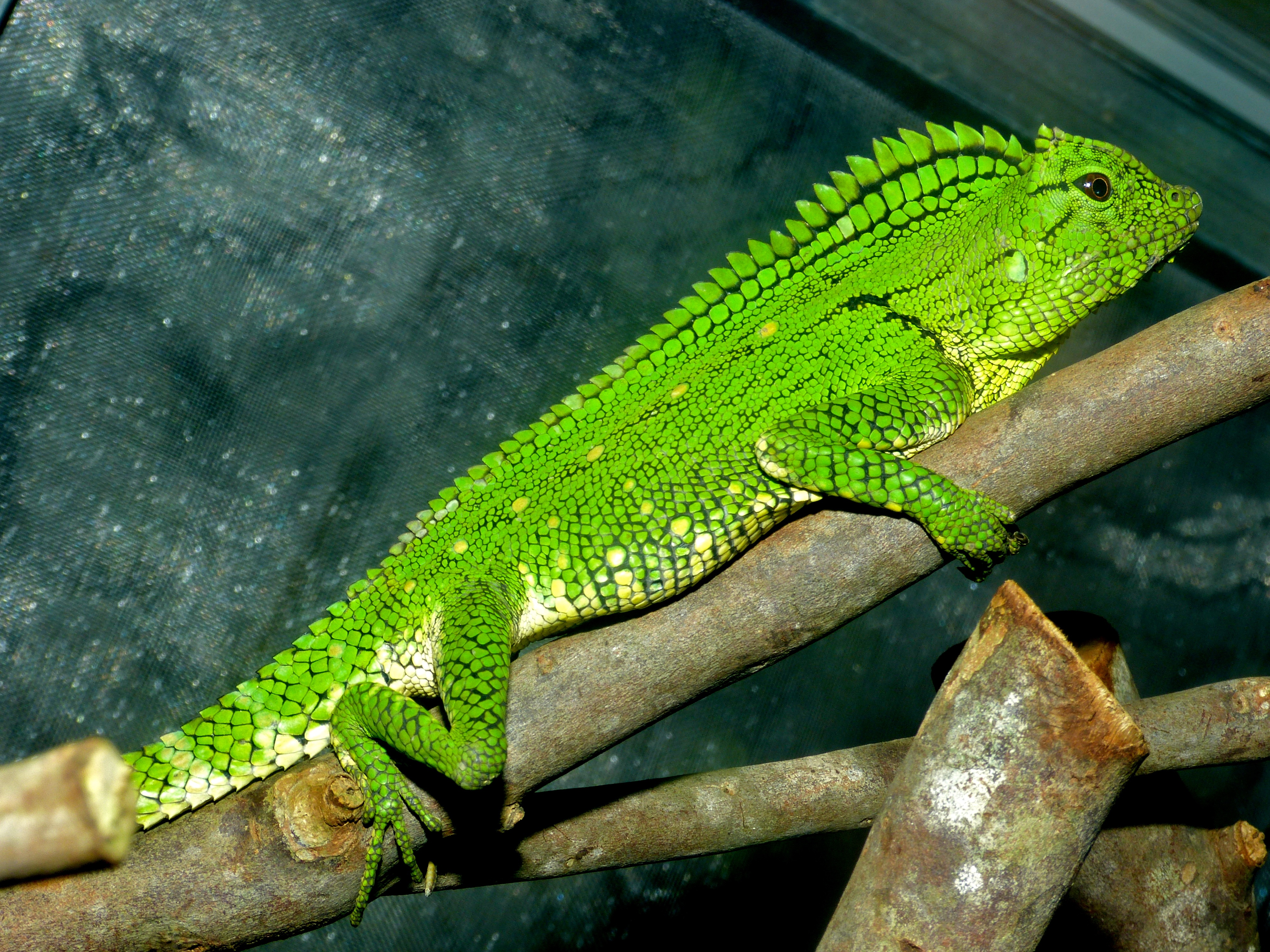
- Female

Conservation status
- Least Concern (IUCN 3.1)

Scientific classification
- Kingdom: Animalia
- Phylum: Chordata
- Class: Reptilia
- Order: Squamata
- Suborder: Iguania
- Family: Agamidae
- Genus: Gonocephalus
- Species: G. doriae
- Subspecies: G. d. abbotti

Trinomial name
- Gonocephalus doriae abbotti Cochran, 1922

= Abbott's crested lizard =

Species of lizard

Abbott's crested lizard (Gonocephalus doriae abbotti), also known commonly as Abbott's anglehead lizard and Cochran's forest dragon, is a subspecies of lizard in the family Agamidae. The subspecies is native to Malaysia and Thailand.

== Etymology ==
Both the subspecific name, abbotti, and two of the common names are in honor of American naturalist William Louis Abbott.

== Geographic range ==
G. doriae abbotti is found in Peninsular Malaysia (Pahang) and southern Thailand (Narathiwat, Pattani, Trang, Yala).

== Habitat ==
The preferred natural habitat of G. doriae abbotti is forest, at altitudes of 200–1,000 m (660–3,280 ft).

== Anatomy ==
Abbott's crested lizard is about 12 in (30 cm) in total length (including tail). The most distinctive anatomical features are the triangular bony crest on the face and the upturned nose. The colors of the dragon range from tan to green with light and dark dots on the body. The most common color is an olive shade of green. Sometimes, G. abbotti has blue eyes. The dragon's structure is compressed and sickle shaped. Its limbs are strong and clawed. It is designed well for catching prey, digging, and climbing. It has exceptional eyesight with small eye openings. The body scales are small. The tail is strong, but it does not grow back if it is broken and can break in defense from predators. The crest is complete from head to tail and remains an additional distinctive feature. The throat pouch is also more developed in males.

== Reproduction and sexual dimorphism ==
Particular information concerning reproduction of G. doriae abbotti is scarce. Gonocephalus dragons in general are seldom bred in captivity. The majority of the dragons are caught in the wild. Most of the Gonocephalus species can breed year around and are also considered territorial lizards. Therefore, it is recommended to only have one or a pair if kept as a pet. They are egg laying lizards producing approximately one to seven eggs. The better condition the female is in, the more eggs she can lay. They reproduce sexually and reach sexual maturity from the ages of two to three. It is typical in Gonocephalus that the male is larger than the female. Also, the male can be reddish-brown to green, whereas the females and juveniles are typically green.

== Human interaction, pet care, and disease ==
G. doriae abbotti's experience interacting with humans has been both positive and negative. The location of the dragon plays a part on the influence. The Thailand and Malaysia regions are subject to farming and the clearing of rainforest timber to acquire more farm land. The end product can result in the destruction of habitats of reptiles and lizards, including Abbott's anglehead. Many exotic lizards and reptiles are also hunted and sold as pets affecting the general diversity of rainforest organisms. Environmental degradation is an issue for Abbott's anglehead along with many other rainforest species. G. doria eabbotti is rated "Least Concern" on the IUCN Red List, and it does appear in the Catalog of life.

The dragon can be a pet. Although lizards in general do not like being handled, they can tolerate human contact as a pet. If a dragon is being handled, it is recommended to handle them sparingly and for short amounts of time. Over handling can stress the dragon and can cause sickness. It is also important to be aware of lizard parasites. Every time a dragon is handled parasites are transferred from human to lizard and vice versa.

Abbott's anglehead is a shy and an excitable dragon; therefore, a spacious pen is recommended to reduce stress and make them feel more at home. In fact, the environmental set up for the dragon is imperative to maintain a healthy dragon such as G. doriae abbotti. The dragon should have an environment that provides a place to obtain warmth and bask. An environment that lacks this feature may accumulate an overabundance of moisture. This can result in blisters. On the other hand, if the environment is too dry the dragon may acquire a shedding problem called dysecdysis. The problem consists of incomplete shedding in areas such as the toes and the tip of the tail. An ideal temperature for a dragon enclosure ranges from 75 to 80 °F (24 to 27 °C) with a place to bask and stay moist. A temperature that is too high can cause heat stroke and or death.

Addition issues that can occur in tame dragons are vitamin A deficiency and metabolic bone disease. Vitamin A deficiency is the shortage of vitamin A or carotenes. The dragon usually obtains vitamin A through the consumption of leafy greens and insects. This deficiency is found typically in tame dragons, since wild dragons have a surplus of greens and insects to eats. The lack of vitamin A can increase the parasitic issues, weakening the immune system, and can lead to the death of the dragon if the diet imbalance is not corrected. The metabolic bone disease is a product of lack of UVB light and calcium. Natural light gives off vitamin D3. This vitamin is vital to break down the calcium the dragon consumes, enhancing the importance of light. The disease can cause soft bones and muscle cramping. According to Langerwerf, signs of an unhealthy dragon include abnormal feces, inability to right itself when turned upside down, limping, sluggish behavior, refusing food, sunken eyes, vomiting, and weight loss.

== Bibliography ==
- "Gonocephalus doriae (Doria's Angleheaded Lizard)". Anderson, V.C. (photographer). 10 March 2009.
- Bain, Raoul H. [in French]; Hurley, Martha M. (2011). "A biogeographic synthesis of the amphibians and reptile of Indochina". Bulletin of the American Museum of Natural History. 360: 1–138. Bibcode:2011BAMNH.360....1B. doi:10.1206/360.1.
- Cochran, D.M. (1922). "Description of a new species of agamid lizard from the Malay Peninsula". Proceedings of the United States National Museum. 60 (2421): 1–3. doi:10.5479/si.00963801.60-2421.1.
- "Cyberlizards home page". Cyberlizards. Cyberlizard UK. 2012. Archived from the original on 2012-11-01.
- Denzer, W.; Mathey, U. (1991). "A normal checklist of the lizards inhabiting the peninsular Malaysia and Singapore". Raffles Bulletin of Zoology. 39 (2): 309–322.
- Dring, J.C.M. (1979). "Amphibians and reptiles from northern Trengganu, Malaysia, with descriptions of two new geckos: Cnemaspis and Cyrtodactylus". Bulletin of the British Museum (Natural History), Zoology. 34 (5): 181–224.
- Heying, H. (2012). "Agamidae". Animal diversity web. University of Michigan Museum of Zoology.
- Kaplan, M. (2012). "Tree dragons and mountain dragons: Gonocephalus and Acanthosaura". Melissa Kaplan's Herp Care Collection.
- Langerwerf, B. (2006). Water Dragons: A complete guide to Physignathus and more. Neptune, New Jersey: T.F.H Publication, Inc.
- Simon, J.E.; Dickey, L.J.; Reece, B.J. (2013). Campbell essential biology with physiology (Fourth ed.). Glenview, Illinois: Pearson Education, Inc.
- Zauhar, C.; Learn, A.; Georgeson, D.; Lanners, S.; Walters, M. (2012). Article. Gonocephalus abbotti.
