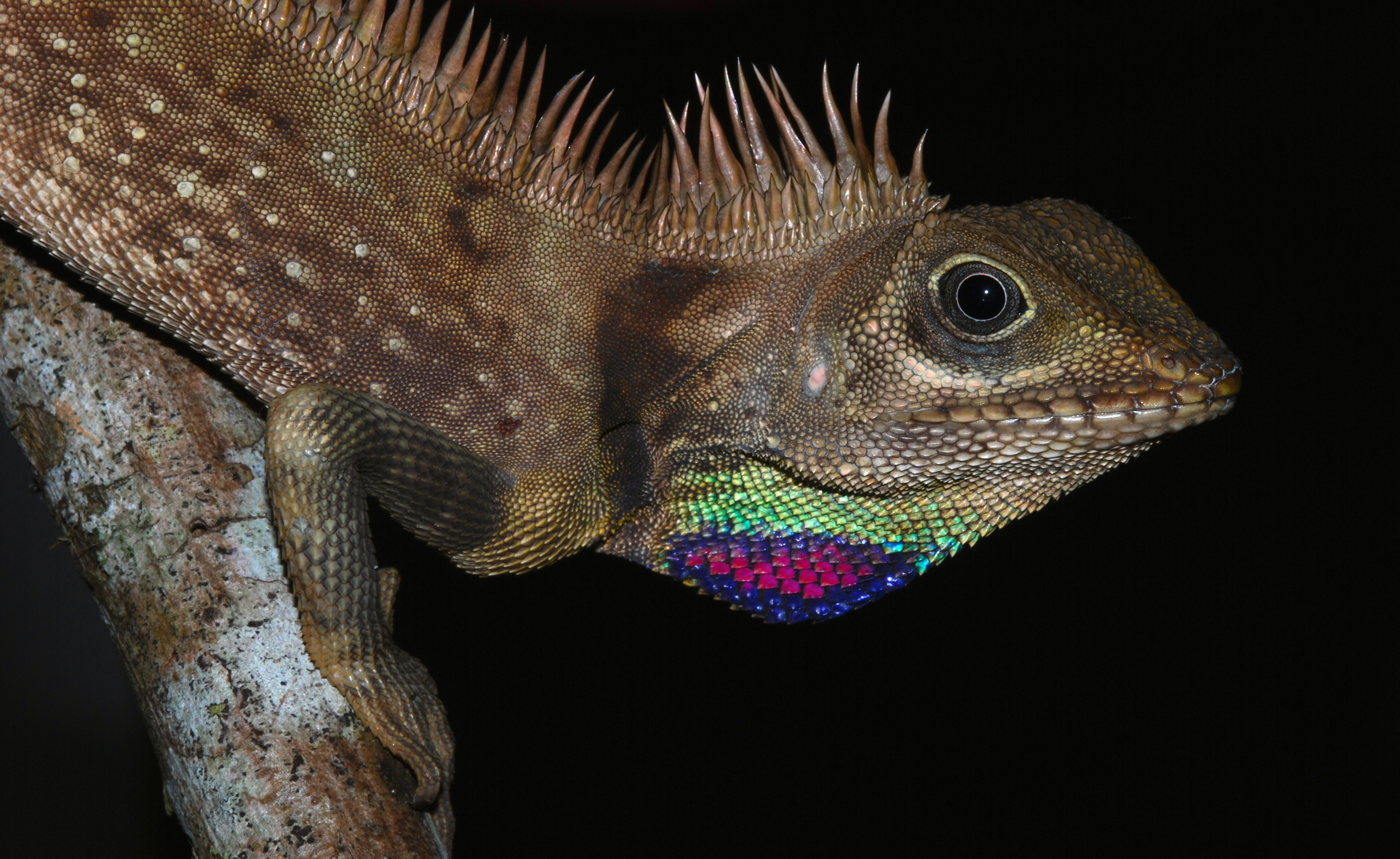

Conservation status
- Least Concern (IUCN 3.1)

Scientific classification
- Kingdom: Animalia
- Phylum: Chordata
- Class: Reptilia
- Order: Squamata
- Suborder: Iguania
- Family: Agamidae
- Genus: Gonocephalus
- Species: G. bellii

Binomial name
- Gonocephalus bellii (A.M.C. Duméril & Bibron, 1837)

Synonyms
- Lophyrus bellii A.M.C. Duméril & Bibron, 1837; Gonyocephalus bellii — Boulenger, 1885; Gonocephalus bellii — Wermuth, 1967

= Gonocephalus bellii =

Species of lizard

Gonocephalus bellii, commonly known as Bell's anglehead lizard or Bell's forest dragon, is a species of lizard in the family Agamidae. The species is native to Southeast Asia and Oceania.

== Etymology ==
The specific name, bellii, is in honor of English zoologist Thomas Bell.

== Geographic range ==
G. bellii is indigenous to Thailand, Malacca, Perak, Pahang, Selangor, Indonesia (Borneo), and West Malaysia.

== Habitat ==
The preferred natural habitat of G. bellii is forest, at altitudes of 1,000–1,800 m (3,280–5,910 ft).

== Description ==
G. bellii ranges in color from greenish-grey to brown with deep brown stripes. Males have a colorful dewlap that ranges from teal to pinkish-purple.

== Reproduction ==
G. bellii is oviparous. Clutch size is 3–5 eggs.

== Taxonomy ==
Gonocephalus bellii may be closely related to or the same species as Gonocephalus bornensis.
