= Furcy (disambiguation) =

Furcy is a village of Port-au-Prince, Haiti.

Furcy may also refer to:

- Furcy Fondeur, Dominican militant and politician
- Henri Furcy, French cabaret singer
