= C. Boden Kloss =

English zoologist

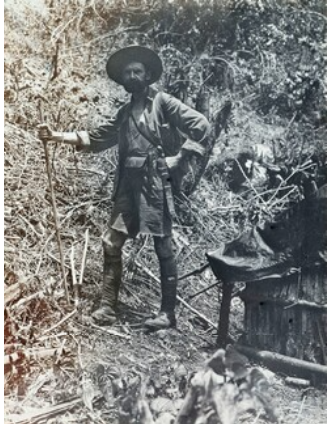
Portrait of Cecil Boden Kloss during the Wollaston Expedition

Cecil Boden Kloss (28 March 1877–19 August 1949) was an English zoologist. He was an expert on the mammals and birds of Southeast Asia. The Rubiaceae genus Klossia was named after him.

Kloss was born in a family of Dutch descent who lived in Worcestershire. In the early 20th century, Kloss accompanied the American naturalist William Louis Abbott in exploring the Andaman and Nicobar islands. During the years 1912-1913 Kloss participated in the 2nd Wollaston Expedition to Dutch New Guinea, led by British medical doctor and explorer A.F.R. "Sandy" Wollaston, in the capacity of zoologist. From 1908 he worked under Herbert Christopher Robinson at the museum in Kuala Lumpur. He was Director of the Raffles Museum from 1923 to 1932 and President of the Malayan Branch of the Royal Asiatic Society in 1930.

Kloss is commemorated in the names of a number of plants and animals, including:

Plants:

- Eugenia klossii, a plant endemic to Malaysia
- Nepenthes klossii, a pitcher plant endemic to New Guinea
- Begonia klossii, a begonia
- Rungia klossii, a small vegetable plant from New Guinea
- Cyathea klossii, a tree fern native to western New Guinea
- Adiantum klossii, a fern

Mammals:

- Hylobates klossii, Kloss's gibbon, endemic to Mentawai Islands, Indonesia
- Euroscaptor klossi, Kloss's mole, found in Laos, Malaysia, and Thailand

Birds:

- Bubo coromandus klossii, a subspecies of the dusky eagle-owl from Malaysia

Reptiles:

- Emoia klossi, Kloss' skink, a lizard endemic to western New Guinea
- Gonocephalus klossi, Kloss' forest dragon, a lizard endemic to Sumatra, Indonesia
- Fimbrios klossi, the bearded snake, from Cambodia, Laos and Vietnam
- Hydrophis klossi, Kloss' seasnake, from the Indian Ocean coastlines of West Malaysia, Thailand (including Phuket), Singapore and Indonesia (Sumatra)

== Works (incomplete) ==
Kloss CB (1903). In the Andamans and Nicobars; The narrative of a cruise in the schooner "Terrapin", with notices of the islands, their fauna, ethnology, etc. London: John Murray. xvi + 373 pp.

== See also ==
- Pengkalan Kempas Historical Complex
