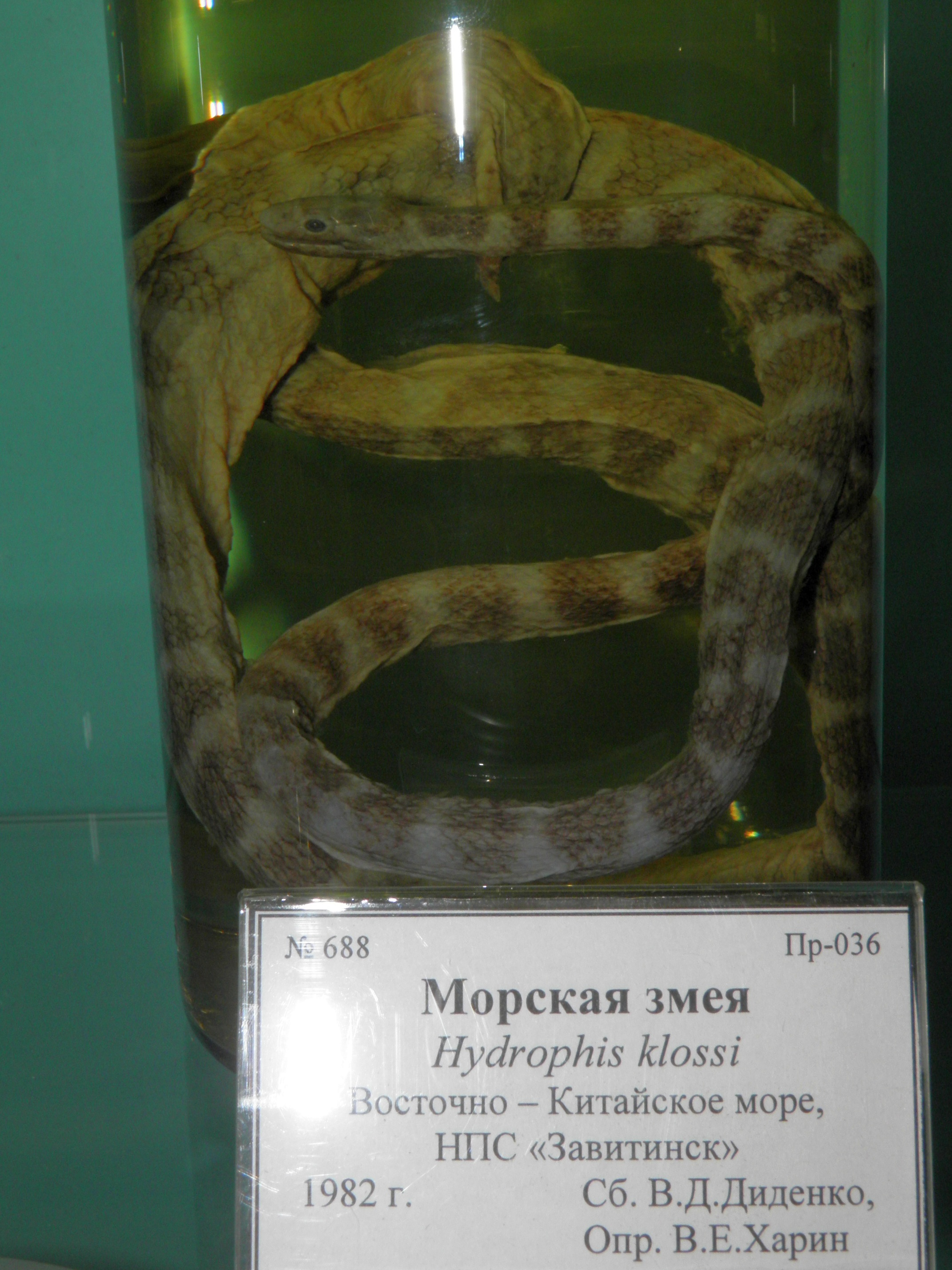
- Hydrophis klossi, preserved specimen in a Russian museum

Conservation status
- Data Deficient (IUCN 3.1)

Scientific classification
- Kingdom: Animalia
- Phylum: Chordata
- Class: Reptilia
- Order: Squamata
- Suborder: Serpentes
- Family: Elapidae
- Genus: Hydrophis
- Species: H. klossi

Binomial name
- Hydrophis klossi Boulenger, 1912

Synonyms
- Hydrophis klossi Boulenger, 1912; Hydrophis (Mediohydrophis) klossi — Kharin, 2004; Mediohydrophis klossi — Wallach et al., 2014

= Hydrophis klossi =

Species of snake

Hydrophis klossi, also commonly known as Kloss's sea snake or Kloss' sea snake, is a species of sea snake in the family Elapidae. Like all other sea snakes, it is venomous. The species is endemic to the Indian Ocean.

== Geographic range ==
H. klossi is found in the Indian Ocean in Cambodia, Indonesia (Sumatra), Peninsular Malaysia, Thailand (including Phuket), and Vietnam.

== Description ==
The body of H. klossi is olive dorsally and yellowish ventrally, with black rings, which are wider than the interspaces on the dorsum, but narrower on the venter. The head is black with yellowish spots.

The type specimen is 90 cm (35 inches) in total length, which includes a tail 7.5 cm (3 inches) long.

The dorsal scales are imbricate (overlapping), smooth on the anterior part of the body, keeled on the posterior part, and arranged in 33 rows around the thickest part of the body (in 25 rows around the neck). The ventrals number 360.

The head is small, and the body is very slender anteriorly. The diameter of the eye is slightly less than its distance from the mouth. The rostral is slightly broader than deep. The frontal is very small, as long as broad, less than half as large as the supraocular. There is one anterior temporal. There are five upper labials, the fourth (or third and fourth) entering the eye. There are two pairs of chin shields, which are in contact with each other. The ventrals are only slightly larger than the contiguous scales.

== Etymology ==
H. klossi is named after Cecil Boden Kloss (1877–1949), director of the Raffles Museum in Singapore from 1923 to 1932.
