= Gonocephalus klossi =

Conservation status
- Near Threatened (IUCN 3.1)

Scientific classification
- Kingdom: Animalia
- Phylum: Chordata
- Class: Reptilia
- Order: Squamata
- Suborder: Iguania
- Family: Agamidae
- Genus: Gonocephalus
- Species: G. klossi

Binomial name
- Gonocephalus klossi (Boulenger, 1920)

Synonyms
- Gonyocephalus [sic] klossi Boulenger, 1920

Species of lizard

Gonocephalus klossi, also known commonly as Kloss's forest dragon or Kloss' forest dragon, is a species of lizard in the family Agamidae. The species is endemic to Sumatra, Indonesia.

== Etymology ==
The specific name, klossi, is in honor of English zoologist Cecil Boden Kloss.

== Geographic range ==
G. klossi is found in western Sumatra, where it has been recorded from the provinces of Bengkulu and Jambi.

== Habitat ==
The preferred natural habitat of G. klossi is forest, at altitudes of 50–1,800 m (160–5,910 ft), but it may also be found in disturbed areas.

== Behavior ==
G. klossi is arboreal and diurnal.

== Reproduction ==
G. klossi is oviparous.
