= Gonocephalus megalepis =

Scientific classification
- Kingdom: Animalia
- Phylum: Chordata
- Class: Reptilia
- Order: Squamata
- Suborder: Iguania
- Family: Agamidae
- Genus: Gonocephalus
- Species: G. megalepis

Binomial name
- Gonocephalus megalepis (Bleeker, 1860)

Species of lizard

Gonocephalus megalepis, also known as Bleeker's forest dragon, is a species of agamid lizard. It is found in Indonesia.
