= Gonocephalus semperi =

Conservation status
- Least Concern (IUCN 3.1)

Scientific classification
- Kingdom: Animalia
- Phylum: Chordata
- Class: Reptilia
- Order: Squamata
- Suborder: Iguania
- Family: Agamidae
- Genus: Gonocephalus
- Species: G. semperi

Binomial name
- Gonocephalus semperi (Peters, 1867)

Species of lizard

Gonocephalus semperi, the Mindoro forest dragon, is a species of agamid lizard. It is found in the Philippines.
