= Gonocephalus pyrius =

Scientific classification
- Kingdom: Animalia
- Phylum: Chordata
- Class: Reptilia
- Order: Squamata
- Suborder: Iguania
- Family: Agamidae
- Genus: Gonocephalus
- Species: G. pyrius

Binomial name
- Gonocephalus pyrius Harvey, Rech, Riyanto, Kurniawan, & Smith, 2021

Species of lizard

Gonocephalus pyrius, the angle-headed dragon, is a species of agamid lizard. It is found in Sumatra.
