= Gonocephalus interruptus =

Conservation status
- Least Concern (IUCN 3.1)

Scientific classification
- Kingdom: Animalia
- Phylum: Chordata
- Class: Reptilia
- Order: Squamata
- Suborder: Iguania
- Family: Agamidae
- Genus: Gonocephalus
- Species: G. interruptus

Binomial name
- Gonocephalus interruptus Boulenger, 1885

Species of lizard

Gonocephalus interruptus, Boulenger's forest dragon or Mindoro anglehead, is a species of agamid lizard. It is found in the Philippines.
