= Alsophila abbottii =

Scientific classification
- Kingdom: Plantae
- Clade: Tracheophytes
- Division: Polypodiophyta
- Class: Polypodiopsida
- Order: Cyatheales
- Family: Cyatheaceae
- Genus: Alsophila
- Species: A. abbottii

Binomial name
- Alsophila abbottii (Maxon) R.M.Tryon

Synonyms
- Cyathea abbottii Maxon

Species of fern

Alsophila abbottii, synonym Cyathea abbottii, is a species of tree fern in the family Cyatheaceae. It is endemic to Hispaniola, where it grows in shaded montane forest at an elevation of 700–1200 m. The trunk is erect and can grow up to 1.6 m in height and 5 cm in diameter. Fronds may reach 1.5 m in length and are pinnate. The rachis is brown and is covered in golden-brown to bicoloured (pale and brown) basal scales. Sori are arranged in two rows along each side of the pinnule midvein. Indusia are rounded and in the shape of a cup.

The species is named after William Louis Abbott (1860-1936), who collected numerous plants on Hispaniola.
