= Gonocephalus beyschlagi =

Conservation status
- Near Threatened (IUCN 3.1)

Scientific classification
- Kingdom: Animalia
- Phylum: Chordata
- Class: Reptilia
- Order: Squamata
- Suborder: Iguania
- Family: Agamidae
- Genus: Gonocephalus
- Species: G. beyschlagi

Binomial name
- Gonocephalus beyschlagi (Boettger, 1892)

Synonyms
- Gonyocephalus beyschlagi Boettger, 1892; Gonocephalus beyschlagi — Manthey & Grossmann, 1997

Species of lizard

Gonocephalus beyschlagi, also known commonly as the Sumatra forest dragon, is a species of lizard in the family Agamidae. The species is native to northern Sumatra, Indonesia.

== Etymology ==
The specific name, beyschlagi, is in honor of Fritz Beyschlag who collected the holotype.

== Habitat ==
The preferred natural habitat of G. beyschlagi is forest, at altitudes below 500 m (1,600 ft).

== Description ==
G. beyschlagi may attain a snout-to-vent length (SVL) of 11.5 cm (4.5 in), with a tail length of 28 cm (11 in).

== Behavior ==
G. beyschlagi is arboreal and diurnal.

== Reproduction ==
G. beyschlagi is oviparous.
