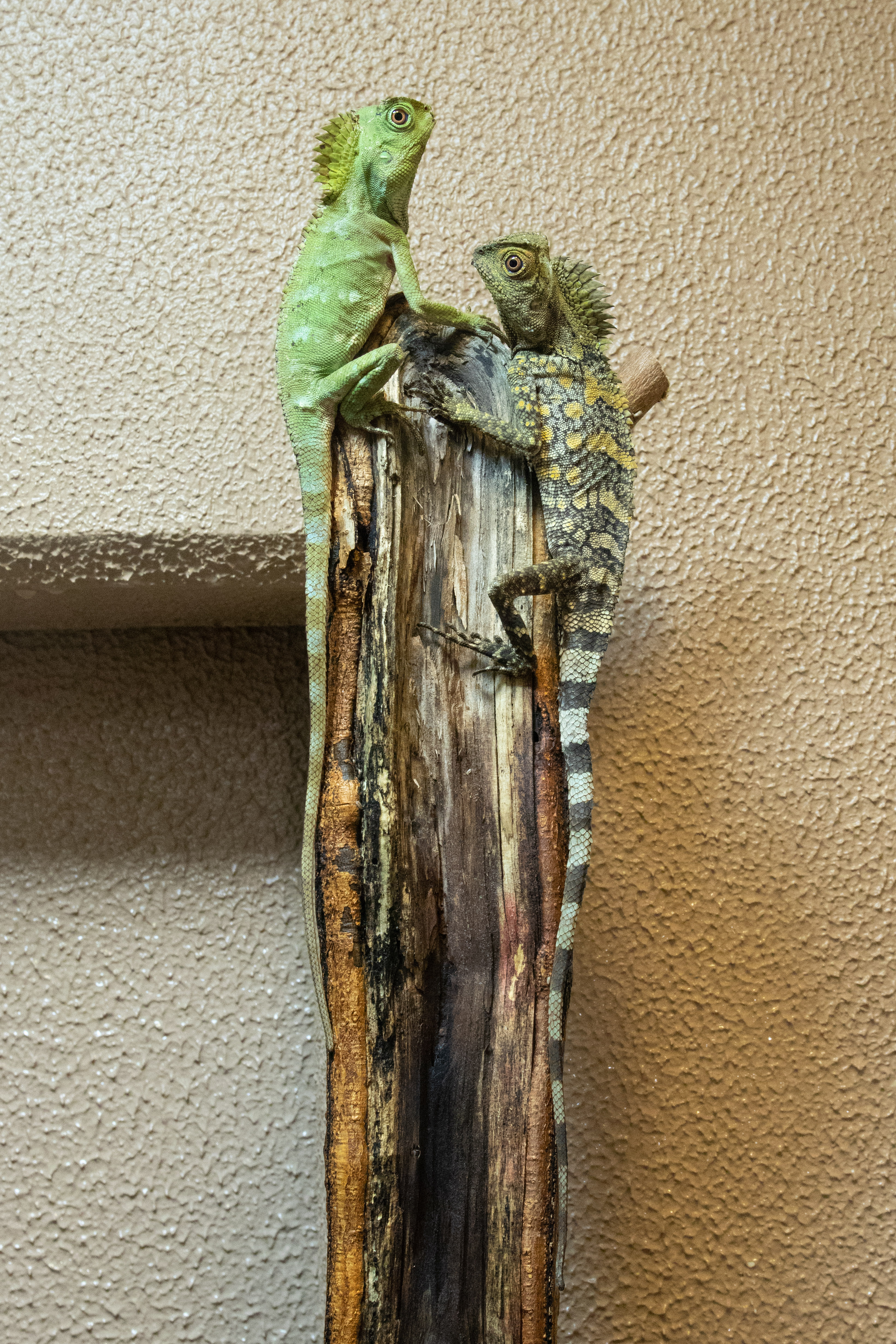

Conservation status
- Least Concern (IUCN 3.1)

Scientific classification
- Kingdom: Animalia
- Phylum: Chordata
- Class: Reptilia
- Order: Squamata
- Suborder: Iguania
- Family: Agamidae
- Genus: Gonocephalus
- Species: G. chamaeleontinus

Binomial name
- Gonocephalus chamaeleontinus (Laurenti, 1768)

Synonyms
- Iguana chamaeleontina Laurenti, 1768

= Gonocephalus chamaeleontinus =

Species of lizard

Gonocephalus chamaeleontinus, the chameleon forest dragon or chameleon anglehead lizard, is a species of agamid lizard from Indonesia and Malaysia.

== Description ==
This species lives in a humid tropical environment, in the forests of central Java. It is a species of around 22–25 cm (8.7–9.8 in), and quite territorial. The lifestyle is close to that of the chameleons. The females are green, with the males bluer, with yellow touches.
