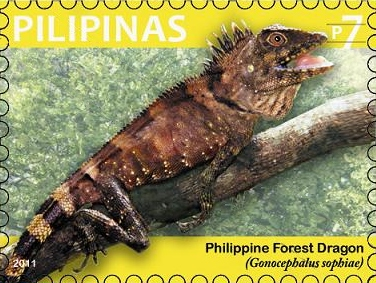

Conservation status
- Least Concern (IUCN 3.1)

Scientific classification
- Kingdom: Animalia
- Phylum: Chordata
- Class: Reptilia
- Order: Squamata
- Suborder: Iguania
- Family: Agamidae
- Genus: Gonocephalus
- Species: G. sophiae

Binomial name
- Gonocephalus sophiae (Gray, 1845)

= Gonocephalus sophiae =

Species of lizard

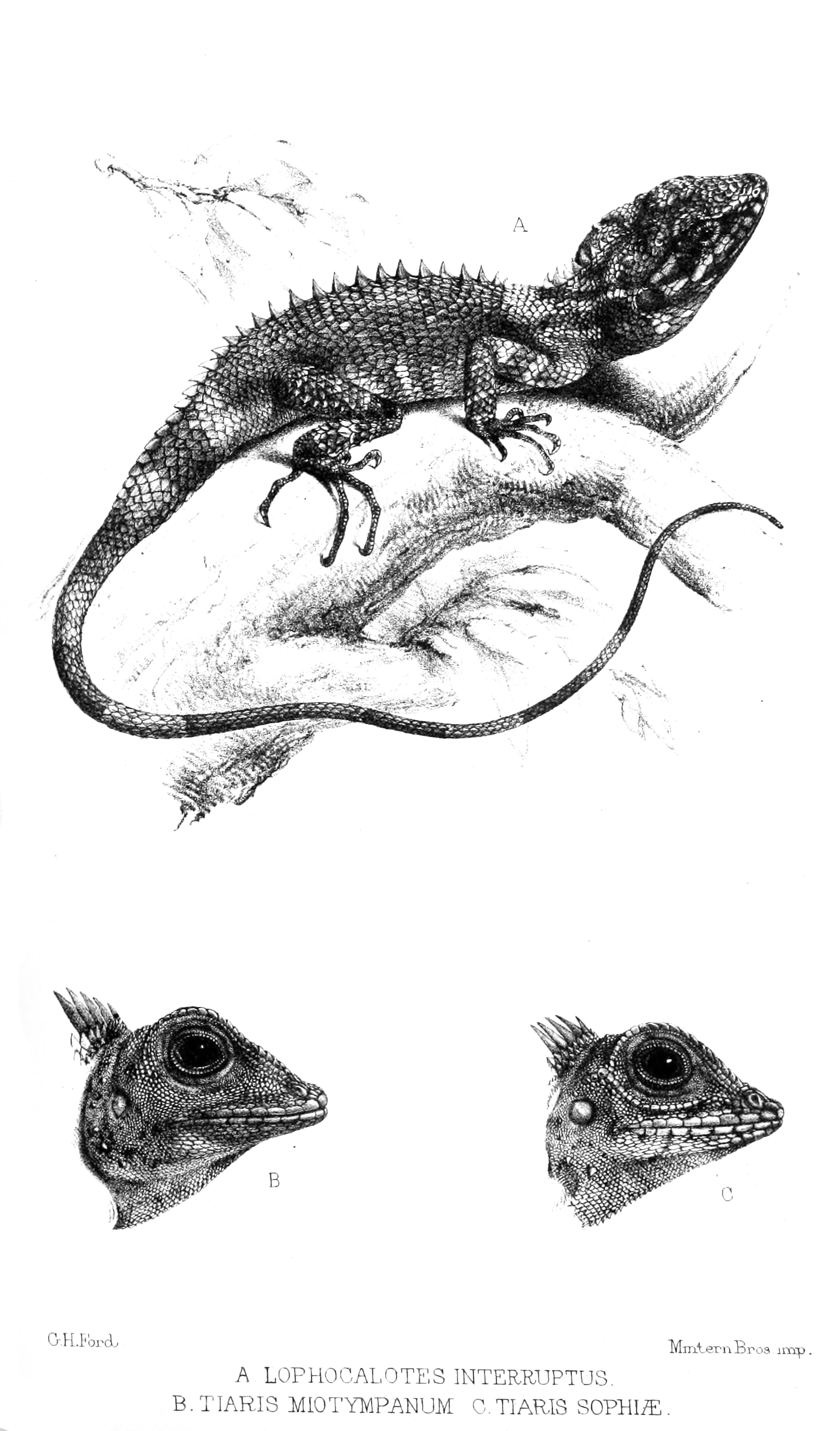

Gonocephalus sophiae, the Negros forest dragon is a species of lizards endemic to the Philippines. It is found between 0 and 1,200 m (0 and 3,940 ft) above sea level on the islands of Negros, Mindanao and Panay, and possibly on Siargao, Luzon, Samar, Palawan and the Calamian Islands. The species is oviparous, and lays eggs in small holes dug in the banks of forest rivers. It is often confused with G. interruptus and G. semperi and therefore remains poorly characterized. Adults reach a total length of ca. 30 cm (12 in) and feed mostly on insects.
