= Klossia montana =

Scientific classification
- Kingdom: Plantae
- Clade: Tracheophytes
- Clade: Angiosperms
- Clade: Eudicots
- Clade: Asterids
- Order: Gentianales
- Family: Rubiaceae
- Subfamily: Rubioideae
- Tribe: Ophiorrhizeae
- Genus: Klossia; Ridl.
- Species: K. montana

Binomial name
- Klossia montana Ridl.

Species of flowering plant

Klossia montana is a species of flowering plants in the family Rubiaceae. It is the only species in the monotypic genus Klossia.

It is native to Malaysia, mainly on the Malay Peninsula.

The genus name of Klossia is in honour of C. Boden Kloss (1877–1949), an English zoologist and was an expert on the mammals and birds of Southeast Asia. The Latin specific epithet of montana means coming from the mountains. Both genus and species were first described and published in J. Fed. Malay States Mus. Vol.4 on pages 27–28 in 1909.
