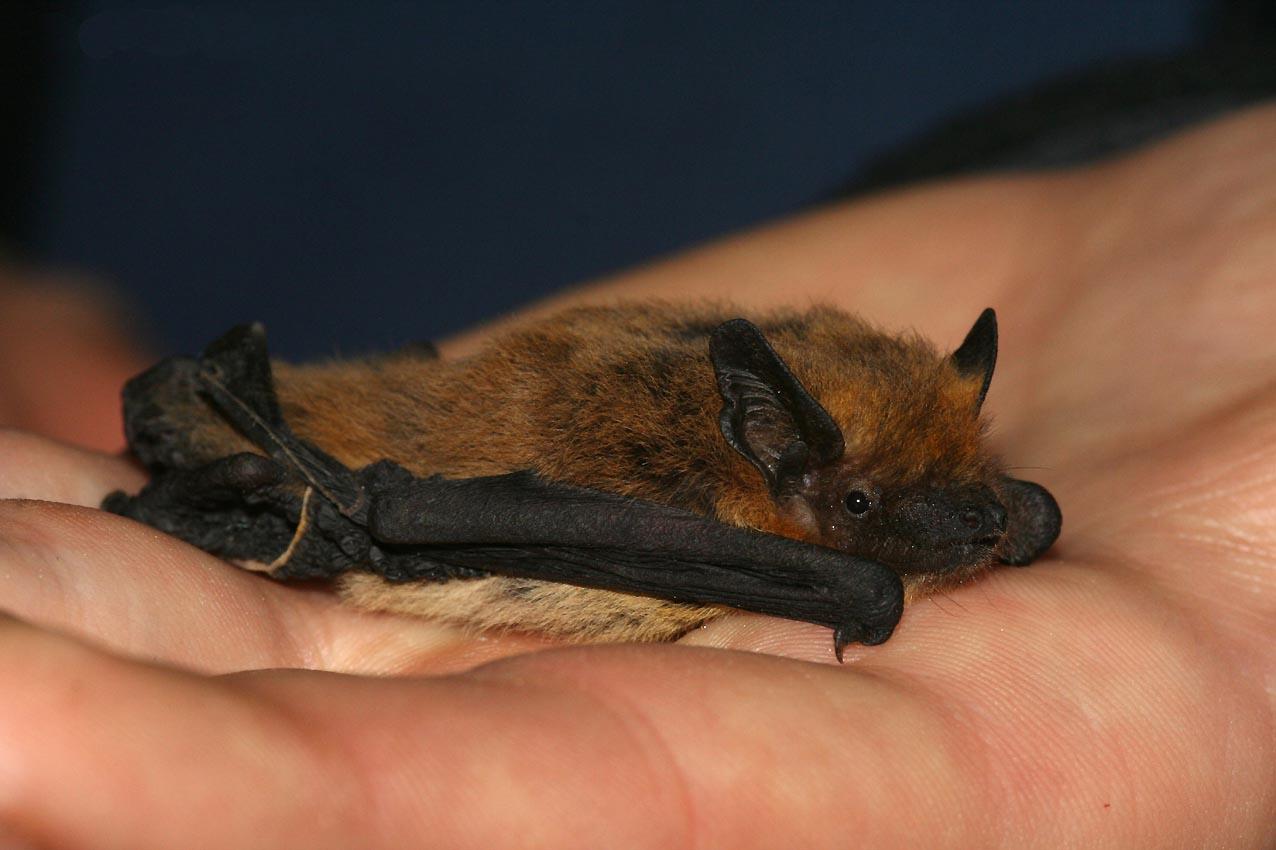

Conservation status
- Least Concern (IUCN 3.1)

Scientific classification
- Kingdom: Animalia
- Phylum: Chordata
- Class: Mammalia
- Order: Chiroptera
- Family: Vespertilionidae
- Genus: Pipistrellus
- Species: P. kuhlii

Binomial name
- Pipistrellus kuhlii Kuhl, 1817
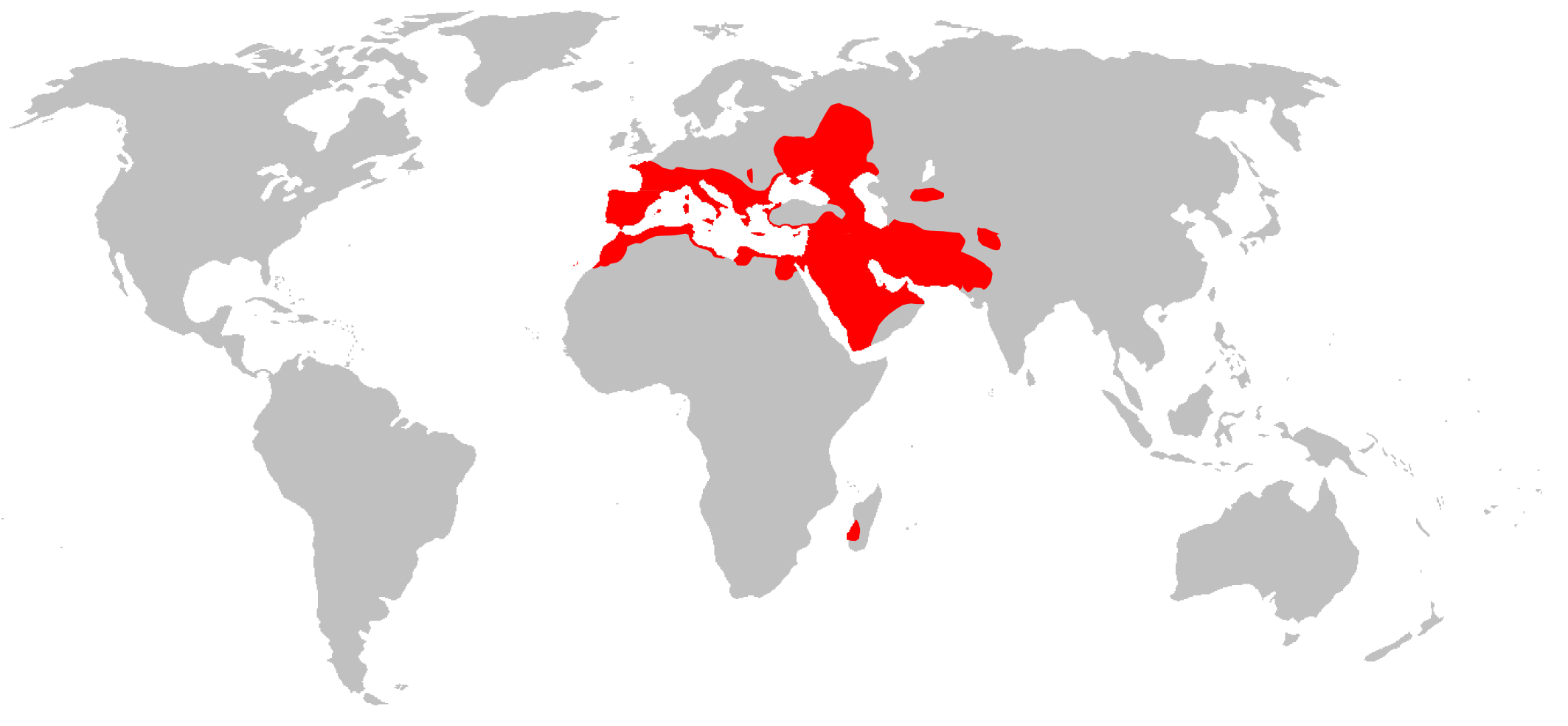
- Global range of P. kuhlii (red)

Synonyms
- Vespertilio kuhlii Kuhl, 1817

= Kuhl's pipistrelle =

Species of bat

Kuhl's pipistrelle (Pipistrellus kuhlii) is a species of vesper bat that occurs in large areas of North Africa, Southern Europe and West Asia. It lives in temperate forests, subtropical or tropical dry shrubland, Mediterranean-type shrubby vegetation, temperate grassland, rural gardens, and urban areas.

== Taxonomy ==
Kuhl's pipistrelle was first described in 1817, under the name Vespertilio kuhlii, in a work by Heinrich Kuhl entitled Die deutschen Fledermäuse ("The bats of Germany"). The specific epithet was chosen by Johann Natterer, who had collected the first specimens, and commemorates Kuhl; under the rules of the International Code of Zoological Nomenclature, however, Kuhl himself is regarded as the authority, as the first to report the name.

The population in Algeria, Egypt, Libya, Sudan was formerly known as Pipistrellus deserti, which is now considered to be a junior synonym of Pipistrellus kuhlii.

== Description ==
Kuhl's pipistrelle's fur is dark brown to yellowish, while the wings are black or dark brown. Some individuals have a white stripe at the wing edges. It has a body length of 40–55 mm (1.6–2.2 in) with a 30–45 mm (1.2–1.8 in) long tail, and it weighs around 5–10 g (0.18–0.35 oz). Its wingspan is 210–230 mm (8.3–9.1 in). It is slightly sexually dimorphic, with males larger than the females.

== Distribution and habitat ==
Kuhl's pipistrelle lives in a variety of habitats, including commonly in urban areas. It occurs from sea-level to an elevation of 2,000 m (6,600 ft). As it is common across a large and increasing range, it is classified as Least Concern on the IUCN Red List.

== Behaviour and ecology ==
Kuhl's pipistrelle is a generalist insectivore, with a widely varying diet depending on the individual and location. In some cases, it may also feed on small amounts of fruit. It feeds by catching its prey in flight by scooping them up in its wings or tail membrane. It typically hunts near other Kuhl's pipistrelles.

To attract females, males will emit mating calls distinct from the normal echolocation calls, often in large groups.
