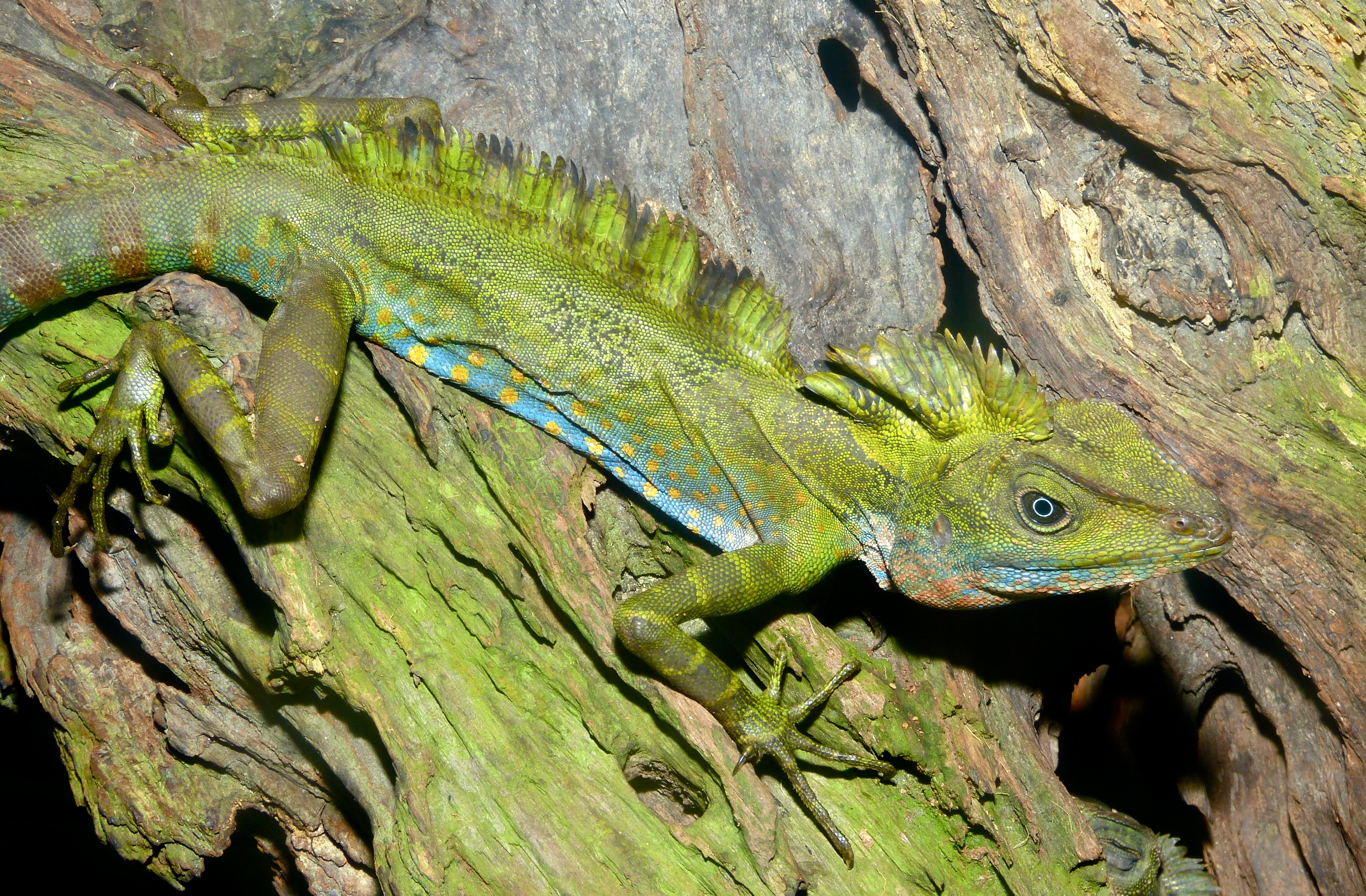

Conservation status
- Least Concern (IUCN 3.1)

Scientific classification
- Kingdom: Animalia
- Phylum: Chordata
- Class: Reptilia
- Order: Squamata
- Suborder: Iguania
- Family: Agamidae
- Genus: Gonocephalus
- Species: G. grandis

Binomial name
- Gonocephalus grandis (JE Gray, 1845)
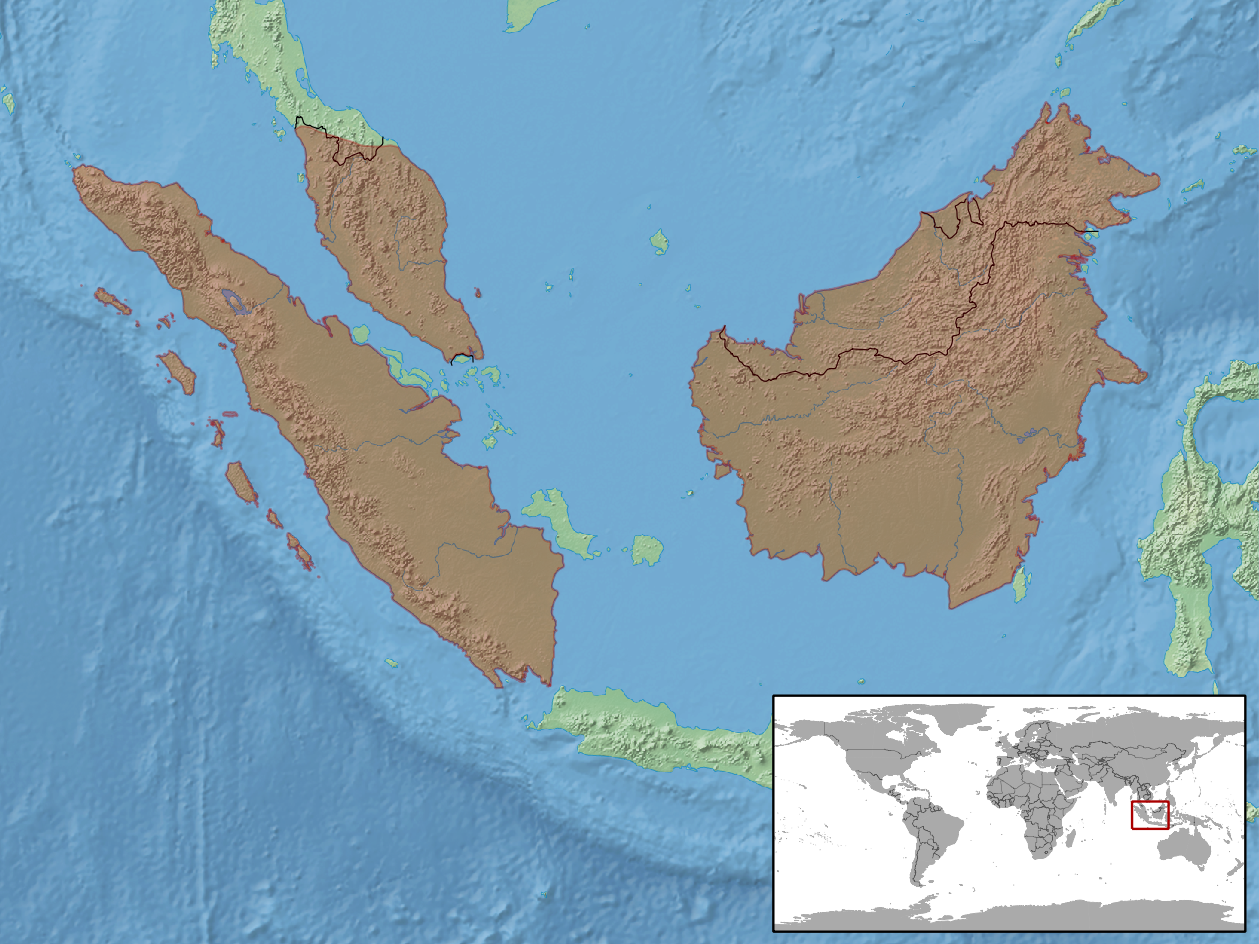

= Gonocephalus grandis =

Species of lizard

Gonocephalus grandis, the giant forest dragon or great anglehead lizard, is a species of agamid lizard. It is found in Thailand, Vietnam, Malaysia, Indonesia, and Myanmar.
