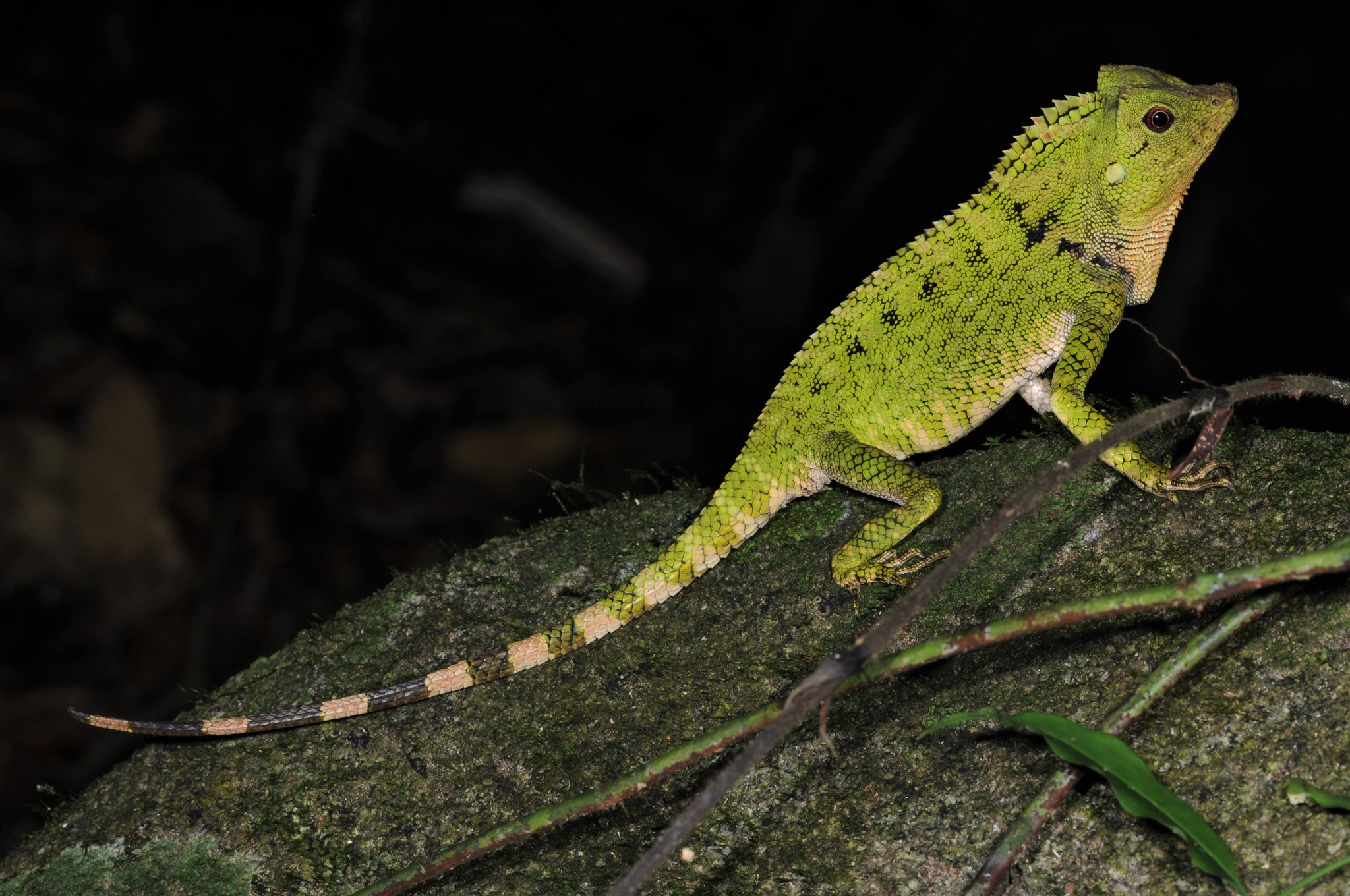
- Gonocephalus doriae, Gunung Gading National Park, Malaysia

Conservation status
- Least Concern (IUCN 3.1)

Scientific classification
- Kingdom: Animalia
- Phylum: Chordata
- Class: Reptilia
- Order: Squamata
- Suborder: Iguania
- Family: Agamidae
- Genus: Gonocephalus
- Species: G. doriae

Binomial name
- Gonocephalus doriae (W. Peters, 1871)

Synonyms
- Gonyocephalus Doriae W. Peters, 1871; Gonyocephalus doriae — Boulenger, 1885; Gonyocephalus doriae — de Rooij, 1915; Gonocephalus doriae — Tweedie, 1954; Gonocephalus doriae — Manthey & Grossman, 1997; Gonocephalus doriae doriae — Manthey & Schuster, 1999

= Gonocephalus doriae =

Species of lizard

Gonocephalus doriae (Doria's angle-headed lizard or Peter's forest dragon) is a species of arboreal lizard in the family Agamidae. The species is endemic to the island of Borneo.

== Etymology ==
G. doriae is named for Marquis Giacomo Doria (1840–1913), an Italian naturalist, botanist, herpetologist and politician, founder of the Museo Civico di Storia Naturale in Genoa (now the Natural History Museum of Giacomo Doria) and its director from then until his death.

== Description ==
G. doriae is usually green on top with dark and light flecks and an indistinct wavy grey pattern, and sometimes with large orange patches. The dewlap/gular pouch is yellow with greyish-blue stripes. There is typically a series of transverse bars on the lower flanks and the ventral surface is lighter. There is a pronounced dorsal crest that is as high as the nuchal crest. It grows to an average snout-vent length of around 165 mm (6.5 in).

== Geographic range ==
Doria's angle-headed lizard is found only in the lowland and hill rainforests of Indonesian Borneo and Malaysian Borneo.

== Behavior ==
G. doriae is diurnal and is typically found perched on the side of a tree or sapling. At night, juveniles and young adults can be found sleeping on the tops of branches with their head pointed back towards the trunk. When threatened, it will often open its mouth, but is generally disinclined to bite.

== Diet ==
The diet of Doria's angle-headed lizard is not recorded, but likely to be primarily arthropods.

== Reproduction ==
G. doriae is oviparous. Little is known about clutch sizes.

== Taxonomy ==
There is some dispute over whether Gonocephalus abbottii represents a full species or is actually a subspecies of G. doriae.
