= Heinrich Kuhl =

German naturalist and zoologist (1797–1821)

- Born: 17 September 1797; Hanau, Hesse, Germany)
- Died: 14 September 1821 (aged 23); Buitenzorg, now Bogor, Indonesia
- Known for: Description of many new species and new genera of amphibians and reptiles
- Scientific career
- Fields: Zoology, botany
- Institutions: University of Groningen; Rijksmuseum van Natuurlijke Historie, Leiden
- Author abbrev. (botany): Kuhl

Heinrich Kuhl (17 September 1797 – 14 September 1821) was a German naturalist and zoologist.

Kuhl was born in Hanau (Hesse, Germany). Between 1817 and 1820, he was the assistant of professor Th. van Swinderen, docent of natural history at the University of Groningen in the Netherlands. In 1817, he published a monograph on bats, and in 1819, he published a survey of the parrots, Conspectus psittacorum. He also published the first monograph on the petrels, and a list of all the birds illustrated in Daubenton's Planches Enluminées and with his friend Johan Coenraad van Hasselt (1797–1823) Beiträge zur Zoologie und vergleichenden Anatomie ("Contributions to Zoology and Comparative Anatomy") that were published at Frankfurt, 1820.

In 1820, he became assistant to Coenraad Jacob Temminck at the Rijksmuseum van Natuurlijke Historie in Leiden. He then travelled to Java, then part of the colonial Netherlands East Indies, with his friend van Hasselt, to study the animals of the island, sending back to the museum at Leiden 200 skeletons, 200 mammal skins of 65 species, 2000 bird skins, 1400 fish, 300 reptiles and amphibians, and many insects and crustaceans.

He described many new species and new genera of amphibians and reptiles.

In 1821, he died in Buitenzorg (now Bogor) of a liver infection brought on by the climate and overexertion. He had been less than a year in Java. Johan van Hasselt continued his work collecting specimens, but died two years later. The partners are buried in a single grave in the Botanical Garden, Bogor, marked with a small column.

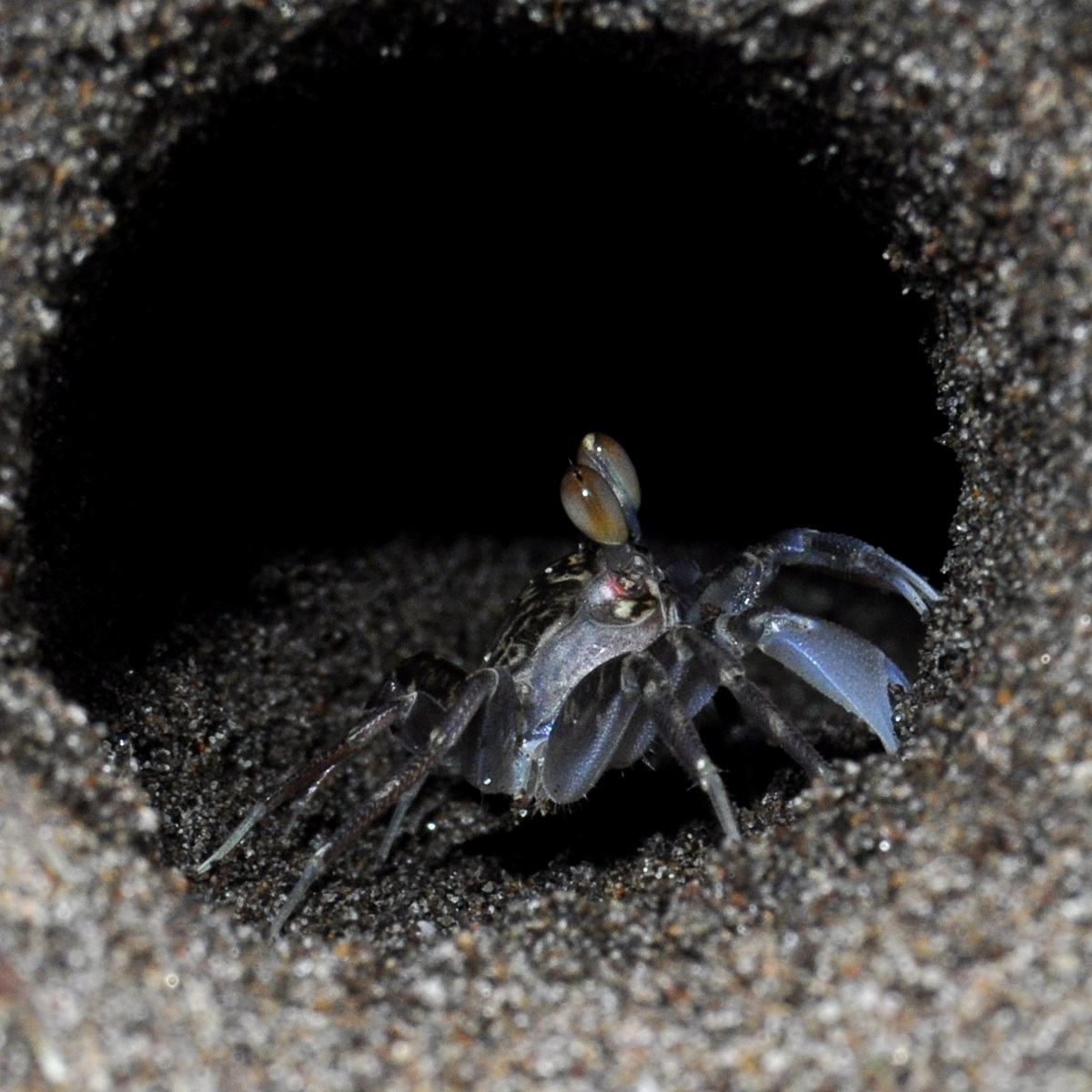
Kuhl's ghost crab, Ocypode kuhlii

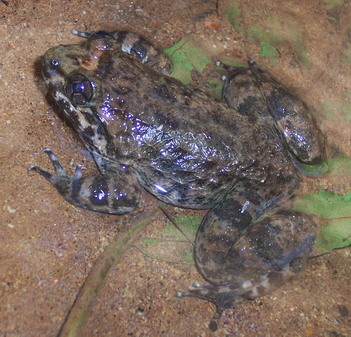
Limnonectes kuhlii

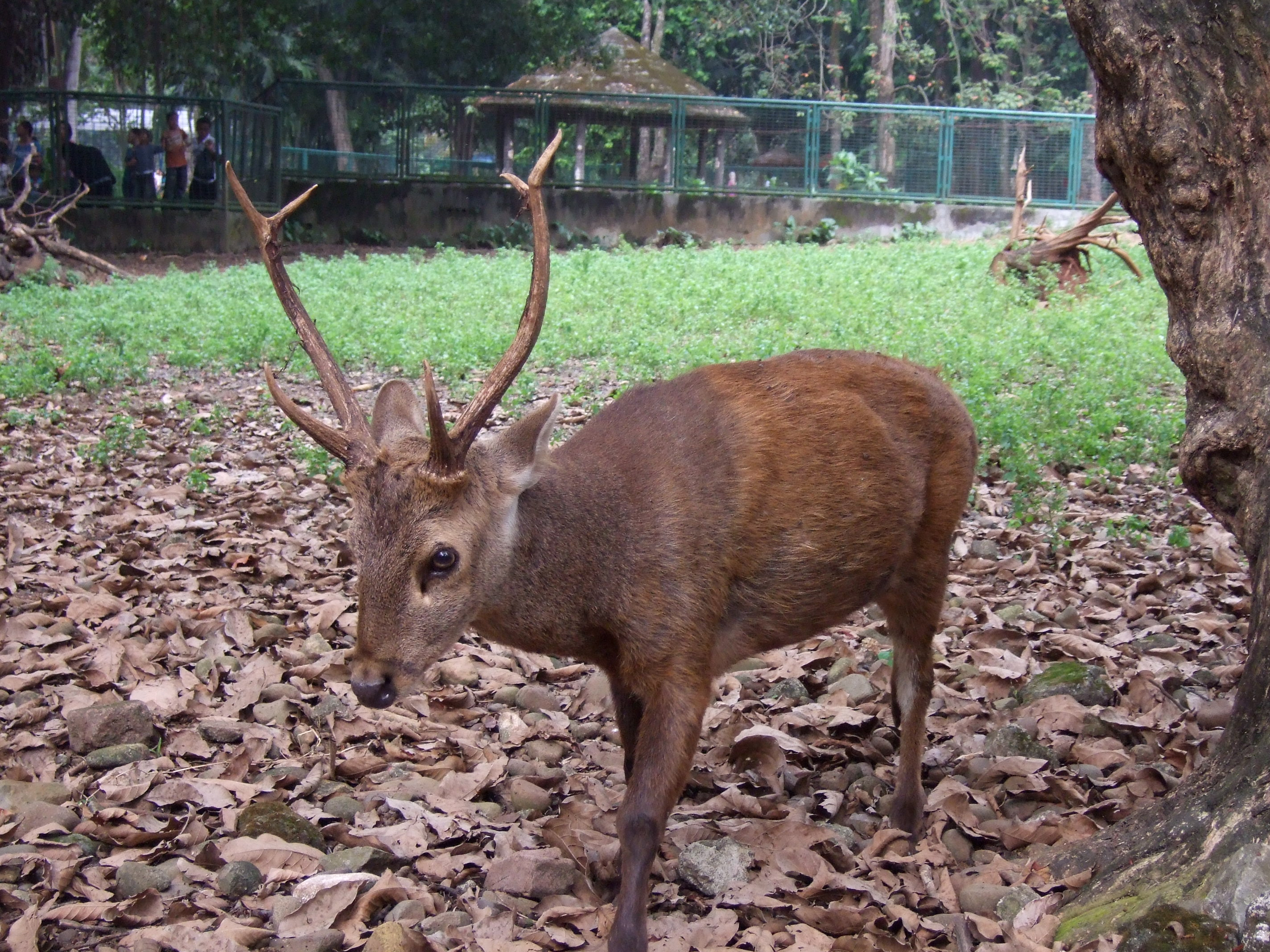
Adult male Bawean deer, Axis kuhlii

== Legacy ==
Several species have been named to commemorate his work as naturalist and zoologist:

Fishes

- Blue-spotted stingray or Kuhl's stingray, Neotrygon kuhlii
- Shortfin devil ray, Mobula kuhlii
- Kuhl's loach or kuhli loach, Pangio kuhlii
- Kuhlia, a genus of marine fish, flagtails or aholeholes

Herpetofauna

- Kuhl's creek frog or large-headed frog, Limnonectes kuhlii, found in Southeast Asia
- Kuhl's forest dragon, Gonocephalus kuhlii, a lizard found in Indonesia
- Kuhl's flying gecko, Gekko kuhli, a gecko found in Southeast Asia

Birds

- Rimatara lorikeet or Kuhl's lorikeet, Vini kuhlii lorikeet in islands of the South Pacific

Mammals

- Axis kuhlii, Bawean deer
- Callithrix kuhlii
- Eptesicus kuhli, synonym of Eptesicus nilssonii
- Pipistrellus kuhlii, Kuhl's pipistrelle
- Sciurillus pusillus kuhlii
- Scotophilus kuhlii

Plants

- Kuhlia, a genus in Salicaceae named by German botanist Kunth (now a synonym of Banara)

== See also ==
- List of herpetologists
- Category:Taxa named by Heinrich Kuhl
