= William Louis Abbott =

American naturalist

- Born: February 23, 1860; Philadelphia, Pennsylvania, U.S.
- Died: April 2, 1936 (aged 76); Maryland, U.S.
- Education: University of Pennsylvania; Royal College of Physicians; Royal College of Surgeons of England
- Occupations: Medical doctor, explorer, ornithologist and field naturalist

William Louis Abbott (23 February 1860 – 2 April 1936) was an American medical doctor, explorer, ornithologist and field naturalist. He compiled prodigious collections of biological specimens and ethnological artefacts from around the world, especially from Maritime Southeast Asia, and was a significant financial supporter of the United States National Museum collecting expeditions.

== Early life and education ==
Abbot was born in Philadelphia. He obtained a Bachelor of Arts at the University of Pennsylvania in 1881 before studying medicine there, graduating in 1884 and subsequently doing postgraduate studies in England, obtaining licentiates from the Royal College of Physicians and Royal College of Surgeons. In 1886, he received a substantial inheritance, ceased the formal practice of medicine, and devoted himself to exploration and collecting.

== Post career ==
In 1923, Abbott retired from active fieldwork but continued to provide funding on several occasions to the United States National Museum for other collecting expeditions.

He died at his farm on the Elk River in Maryland of heart disease after a long illness, leaving his books, papers and 20% of his estate to the Smithsonian Institution. At the time of his death, he was the largest single contributor to the collections of the museum. Abbott's name is commemorated in the names of numerous animal taxa, including those of Abbott's crested lizard (Gonocephalus abbotti ), Abbott's day gecko (Phelsuma abbotti ), Abbott's booby (Papasula abbotti), Abbott's starling (Cinnyricinclus femoralis), pygmy cuckoo-shrike (Coracina abbotti), Abbott's sunbird (Cinnyris sovimanga abbotti), the western grey gibbon (Hylobates abbotti) and Abbott's duiker (Cephalophus spadix). Plants named after him include Cyathea abbottii, a tree-fern native to Hispaniola, and Begonia abbotti, which is endemic to Haiti.

== Exploration and collecting expeditions ==
Journeys of exploration and collecting made by Abbott include:

- 1880 – Bird collecting in Iowa and North Dakota
- 1883 – Bird collecting in Cuba and Santo Domingo
- 1887–89 – Taveta region, near Mount Kilimanjaro, in Kenya, East Africa
- 1890 – Zanzibar, Seychelles and Madagascar
- 1891 – India: Baltistan, Karachi, Kashmir and Srinagar
- 1892 – Kashmir, Baltistan, Aden, Seychelles and the Aldabra Group
- 1893 – Seychelles, Kashmir, Srinagar, Ladakh, Sinkiang and eastern Turkestan. Shot the last recorded Seychelles parakeet on Mahé in March 1893.
- 1894 – As well as travelling in eastern Turkestan, India and Ceylon, he went to Madagascar to enlist in the native "Hova" army against the second French occupation of the island, until local suspicion of foreigners forced his resignation
- 1895 – Madagascar and Kashmir
- 1896 – Malay Peninsula including Perak, Penang and Trang, with a visit to Canton
- 1897 – Trang, Penang and India
- 1898 – As well as volunteering for the Spanish–American War and serving under William A. Chanler in Cuba, where he was wounded in the Battle of Tayacoba, he traveled to Singapore and China, making a visit to Tibet
- 1899 – Abbott constructed the schooner "Terrapin" and, using Singapore as a base for the next ten years, travelled throughout the islands of Maritime Southeast Asia often accompanied by Cecil Boden Kloss. Places visited include the Mergui Archipelago, Natuna Islands, the Andaman and Nicobar Islands, Burma, Malaya, Sumatra, Borneo, Nias, the Mentawai Islands, Enggano, the Riau Archipelago and islands in the South China and Java Seas.
- 1909 – The onset of partial blindness, caused by spirochetosis, forced him to sell the "Terrapin" and largely suspend his collecting in the tropics. After treatment in Germany, from 1910 to 1915, he travelled in Kashmir, though making a brief collecting visit to the Maluku Islands and Sulawesi with his sister in 1914.
- 1916 – Dominican Republic
- 1917–18 – Haiti, where he suffered a near-fatal attack of dysentery
- 1919–23 – Hispaniola
