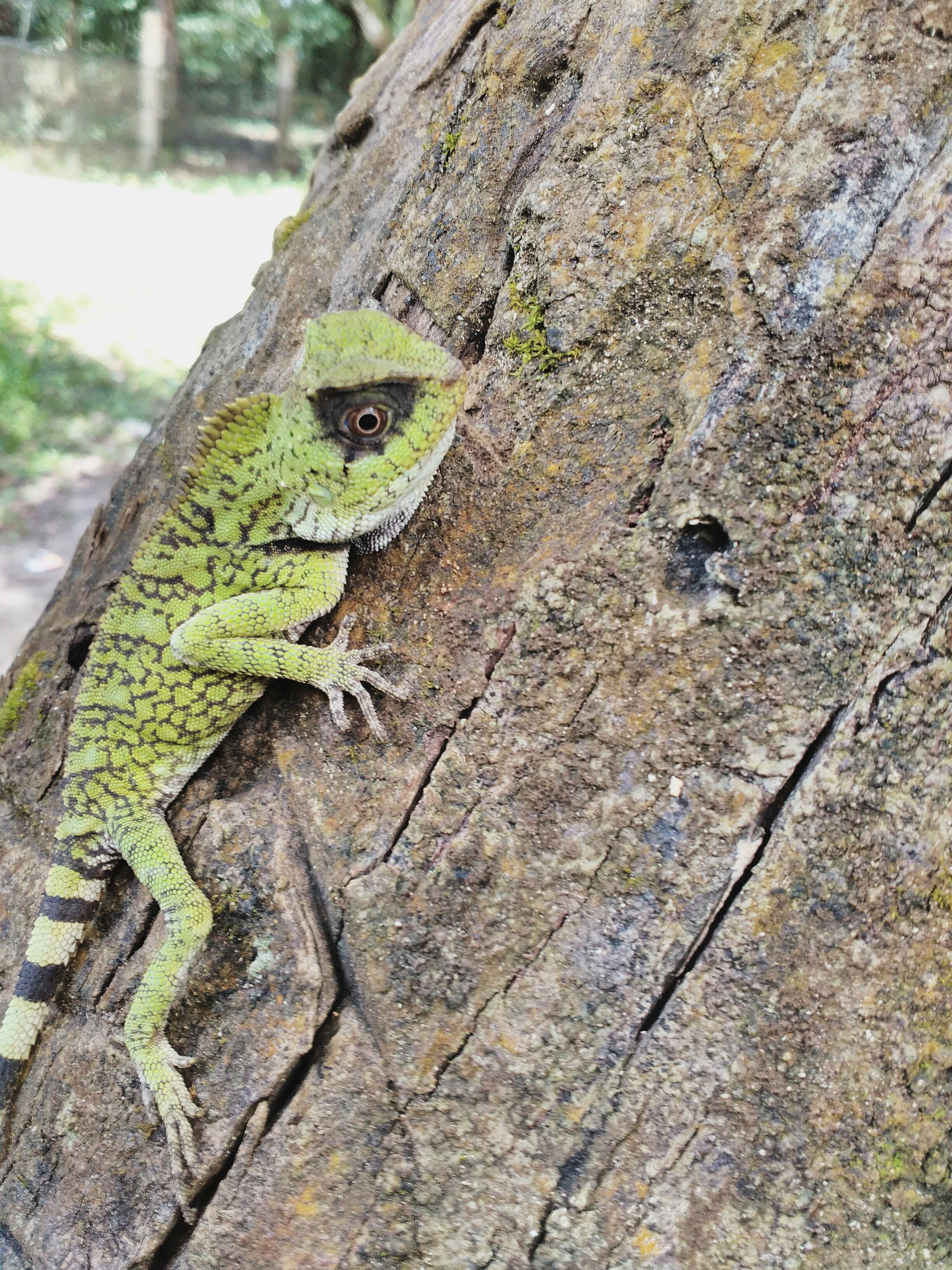
- G. kuhlii on a tree trunk in Ujung Kulon National Park, Java, Indonesia

Conservation status
- Vulnerable (IUCN 3.1)

Scientific classification
- Kingdom: Animalia
- Phylum: Chordata
- Class: Reptilia
- Order: Squamata
- Suborder: Iguania
- Family: Agamidae
- Genus: Gonocephalus
- Species: G. kuhlii

Binomial name
- Gonocephalus kuhlii (Schlegel, 1851)

Synonyms
- Lophyrus kuhlii Schlegel, 1851; Gonyocephalus kuhlii — Boulenger, 1885; Gonyocephalus kuhli — de Rooij, 1915; Gonocephalus kuhlii — Manthey & Denzer, 1993

= Gonocephalus kuhlii =

Species of lizard

Gonocephalus kuhlii is a species of lizard in the family Agamidae. The species is native to Indonesia.

== Etymology ==
The specific name, kuhlii, is in honor of German ornithologist Heinrich Kuhl.

== Geographic range ==
Within Indonesia, G. kuhlii is found on the islands Java and Sumatra.

== Habitat ==
The preferred natural habitat of G. kuhlii is forest, at altitudes of 700–1,200 m (2,300–3,900 ft).

== Behavior ==
G. kuhlii is arboreal and diurnal.

== Reproduction ==
G. kuhlii is oviparous. The usual clutch size is four eggs.
