= Gonocephalus inauris =

Scientific classification
- Kingdom: Animalia
- Phylum: Chordata
- Class: Reptilia
- Order: Squamata
- Suborder: Iguania
- Family: Agamidae
- Genus: Gonocephalus
- Species: G. inauris

Binomial name
- Gonocephalus inauris Harvey, Sarker, Sidik, Kurniawan, & Smith, 2023

Species of lizard

Gonocephalus inauris is a species of agamid lizard. G. inauris is found in Indonesia. This species can grow to be 134 millimeters long. The holotype (MZB 15389) of Gonocephalus inauris was found sleeping on a leaf.
