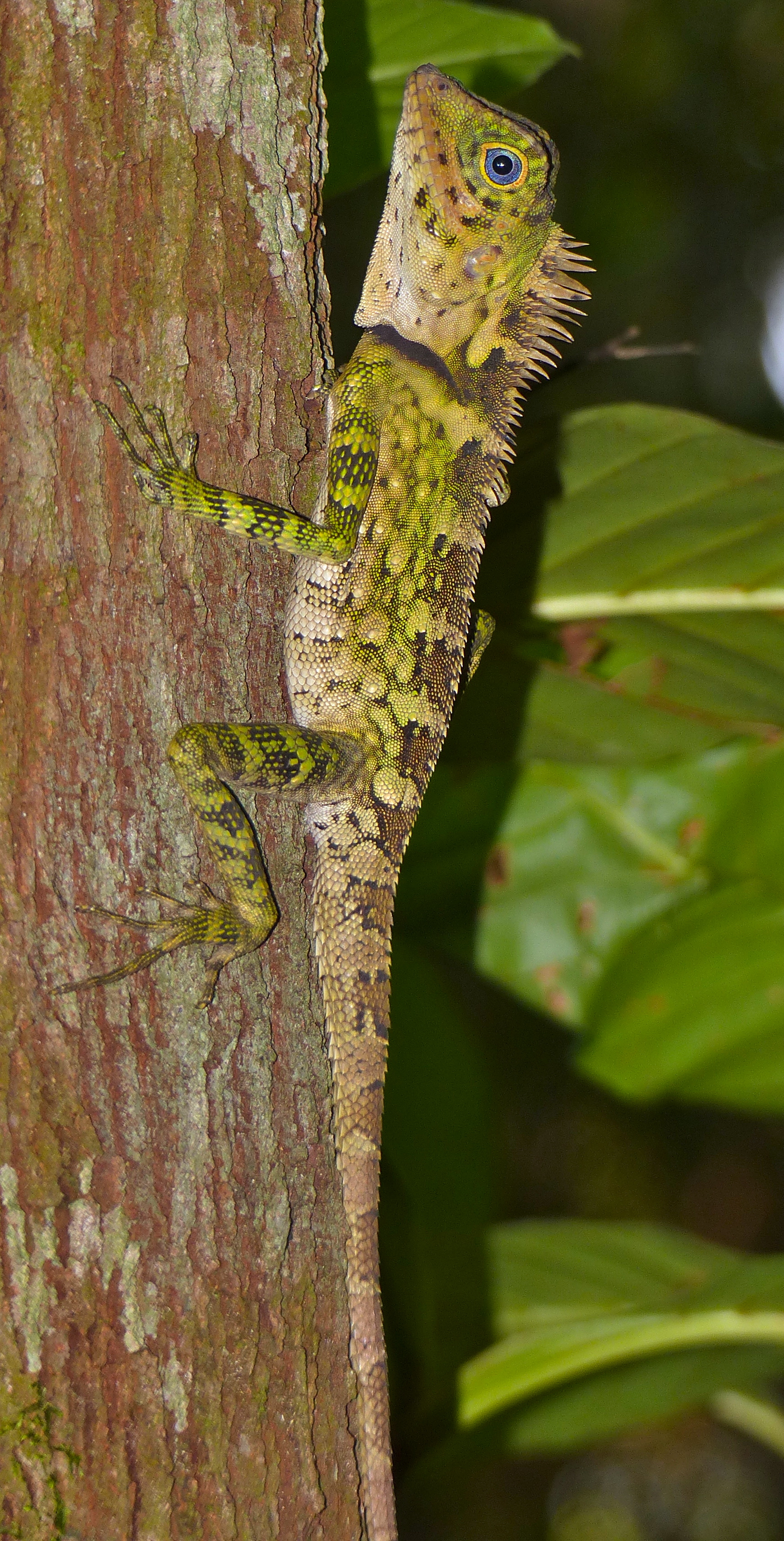

Conservation status
- Least Concern (IUCN 3.1)

Scientific classification
- Kingdom: Animalia
- Phylum: Chordata
- Class: Reptilia
- Order: Squamata
- Suborder: Iguania
- Family: Agamidae
- Genus: Gonocephalus
- Species: G. liogaster

Binomial name
- Gonocephalus liogaster (Günther, 1872)

Synonyms
- Tiaris liogaster Günther, 1872; Gonyocephalus liogaster — Boulenger, 1885; Goniocephalus herveyi Boulenger, 1887; Gonocephalus liogaster — Wermuth, 1967

= Gonocephalus liogaster =

Species of lizard

Gonocephalus liogaster, also known commonly as the blue-eyed anglehead lizard, the orange-ringed anglehead lizard, and the tropical forest dragon, is a species of lizard in the family Agamidae. The species is native to Southeast Asia.

== Geographic range ==
G. liogaster is found in Indonesia (Borneo, Natuna Islands, Sumatra) and Malaysia (West Malaysia).

== Habitat ==
The preferred natural habitats of G. liogaster are forest and freshwater wetlands, at altitudes of 100–400 m (330–1,310 ft).

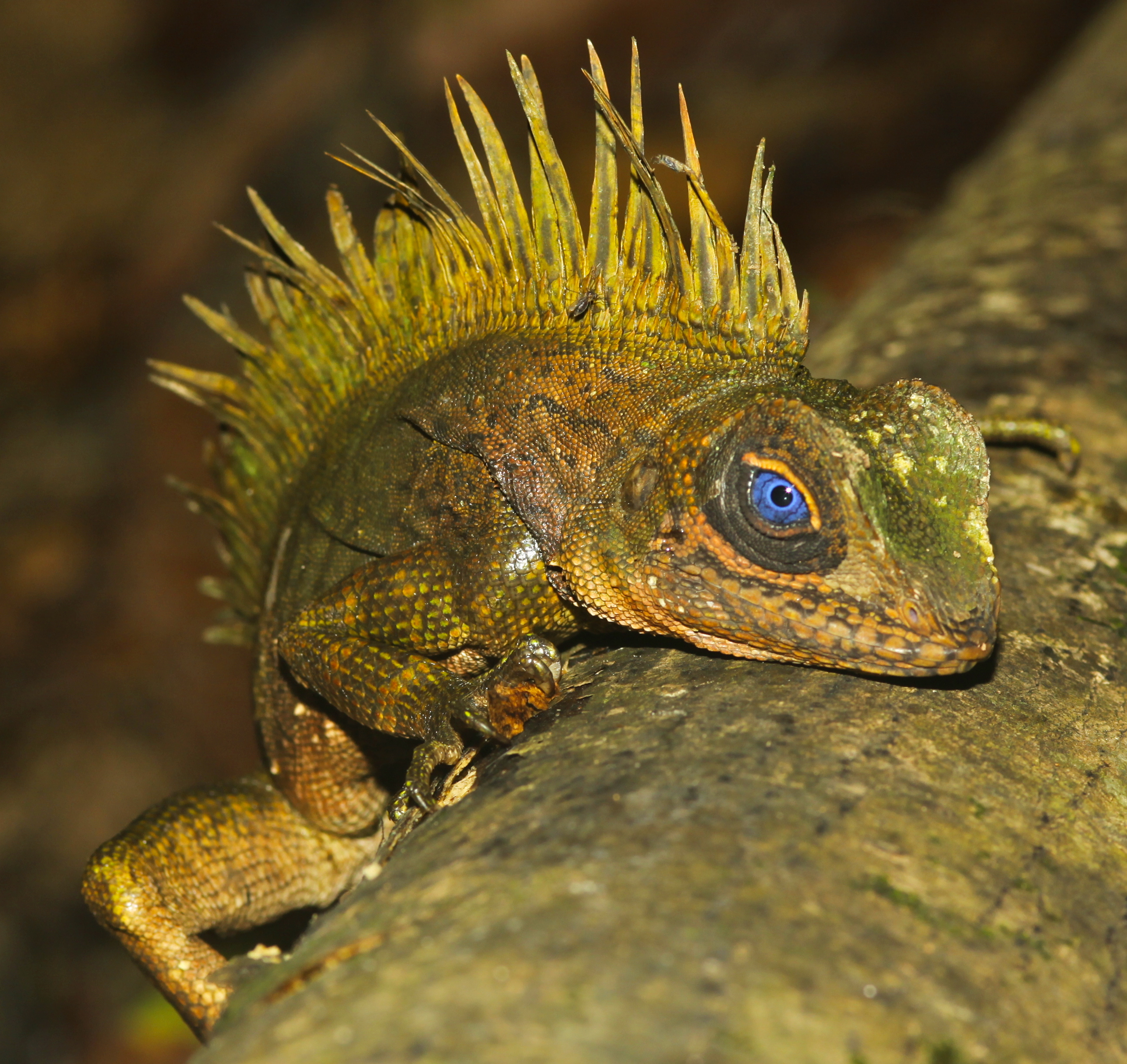
Male.

== Description ==
A large and robust lizard, G. liogaster may attain a snout-to-vent length (SVL) of 14 cm (5.5 in), plus a tail length of 31.5 cm (12.4 in). The tail is laterally compressed, and all four legs are long. The iris of the eye is blue in males, but brown in females.

== Behavior ==
G. liogaster is diurnal and arboreal.

== Diet ==
G. liogaster preys upon insects.

== Reproduction ==
G. liogaster is oviparous. Clutch size is usually three eggs, but may be as few as one or as many as four. Each egg measures 23 mm × 11 mm (0.91 in × 0.43 in). After a period of about 100 days, the eggs hatch in August.
