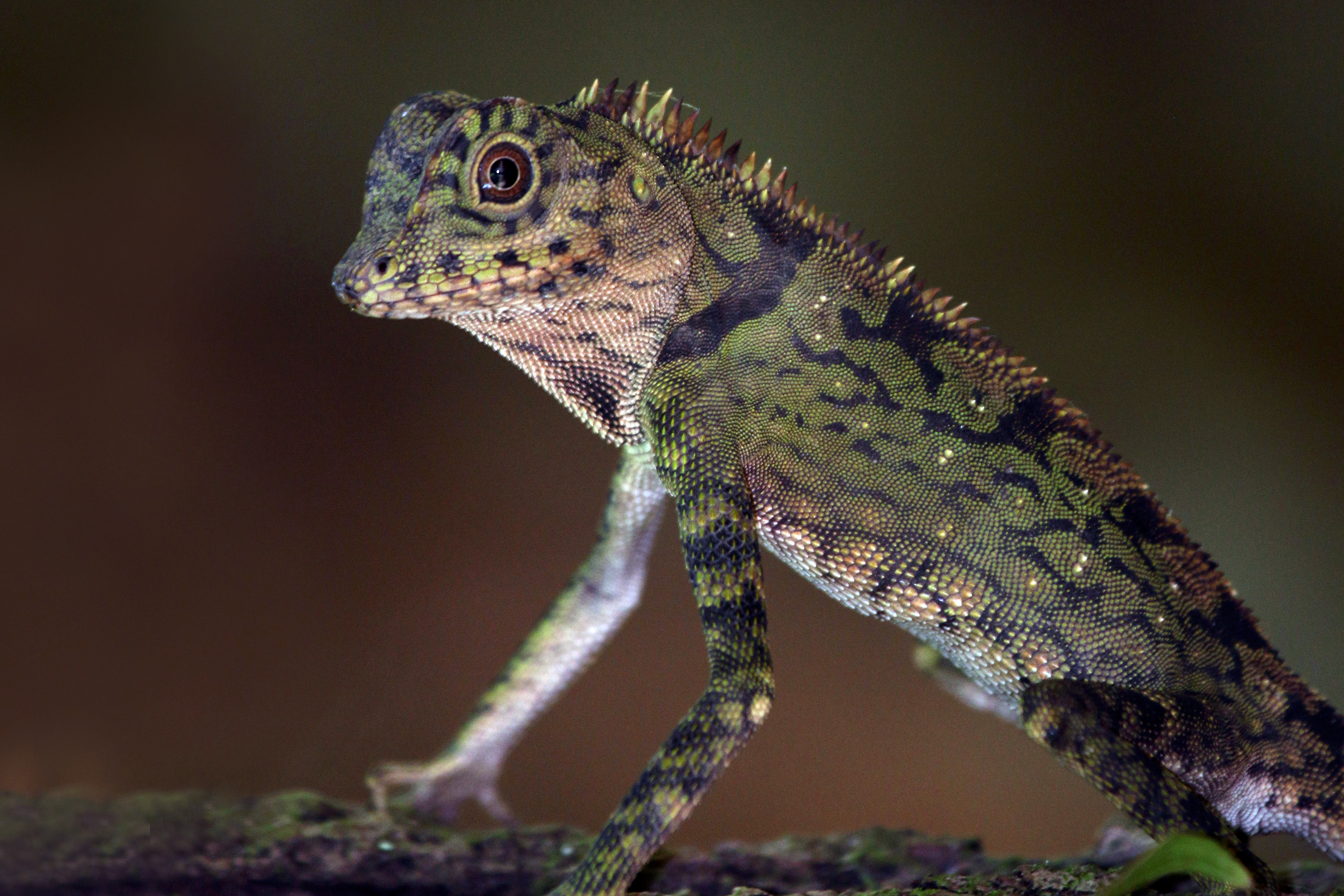
- male in Danum Valley Conservation Area, Sabah, Borneo

Conservation status
- Least Concern (IUCN 3.1)

Scientific classification
- Kingdom: Animalia
- Phylum: Chordata
- Class: Reptilia
- Order: Squamata
- Suborder: Iguania
- Family: Agamidae
- Genus: Gonocephalus
- Species: G. bornensis

Binomial name
- Gonocephalus bornensis (Schlegel, 1851)

Synonyms
- Lophyrus bornensis Schlegel, 1851; Tiaris miotympanum Günther, 1872; Gonyocephalus borneensis — Boulenger, 1885; Gonocephalus borneensis — M.A. Smith, 1931; Goniocephalus borneensis — Taylor, 1963; Gonocephalus denzeri Manthey, 1991; Gonocephalus bornensis — Malkmus et al., 2002

= Gonocephalus bornensis =

Species of lizard

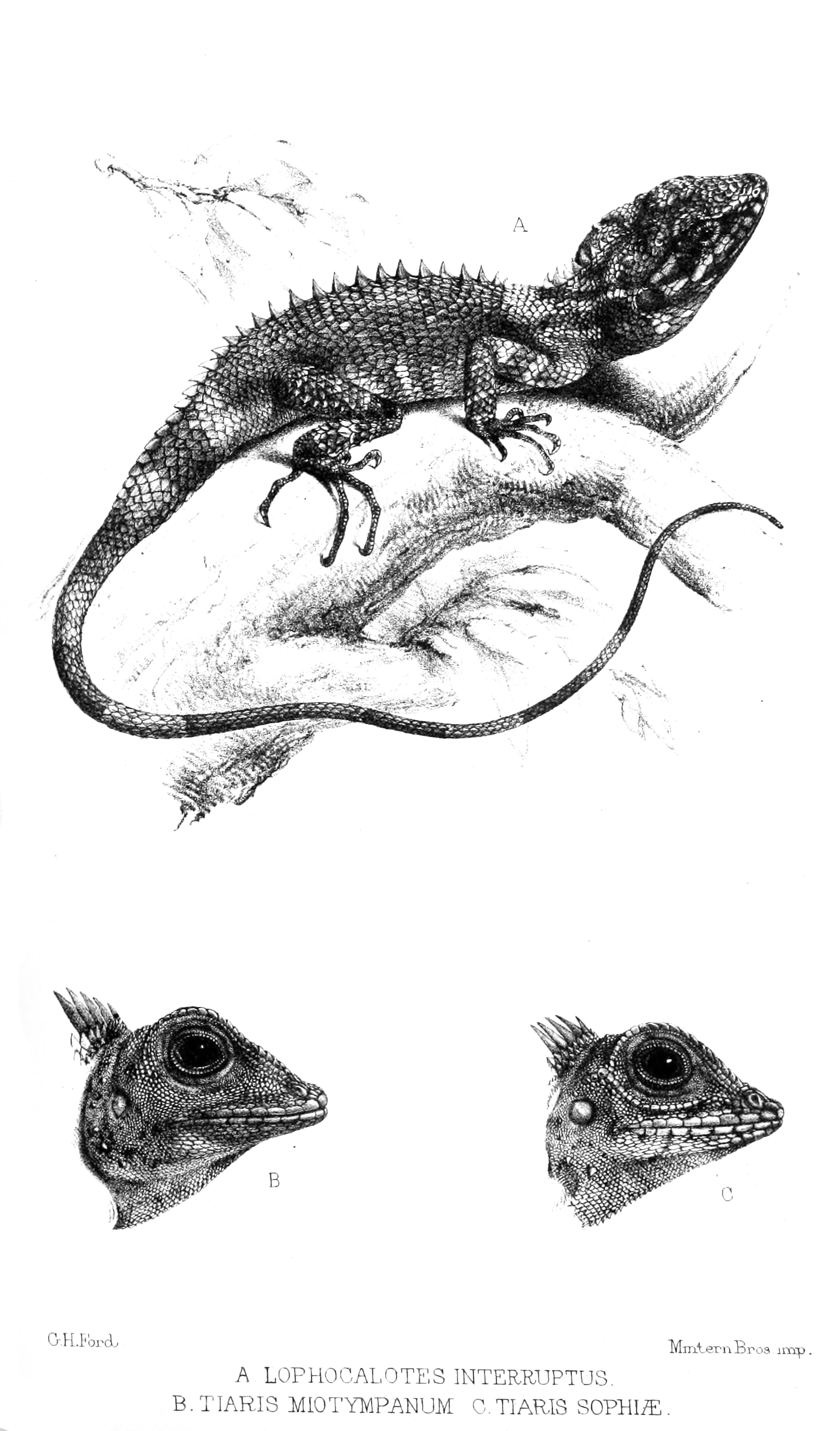
Tiaris miotympanum (bottom left) is a synonym of Gonocephalus bornensis. From Günther 1872.

Gonocephalus bornensis, the Borneo anglehead lizard or Borneo forest dragon, is an agamid lizard endemic to Borneo in Indonesia and Malaysia, and known from Sabah, Kinabalu, Brunei, Sarawak and Kalimantan.

== Description ==
Moderately long (SVL up to 136 mm). Males generally larger than females (SVL= 118-136 vs. 90–130 mm; Tail Length=261-310 vs. 215–275 mm). Circular border on supercilium. Tympanum rather small. Weakly granular dorsum with a prominent lanceolate crest starting on neck and terminating on lower back. Tail is almost cylindrical.

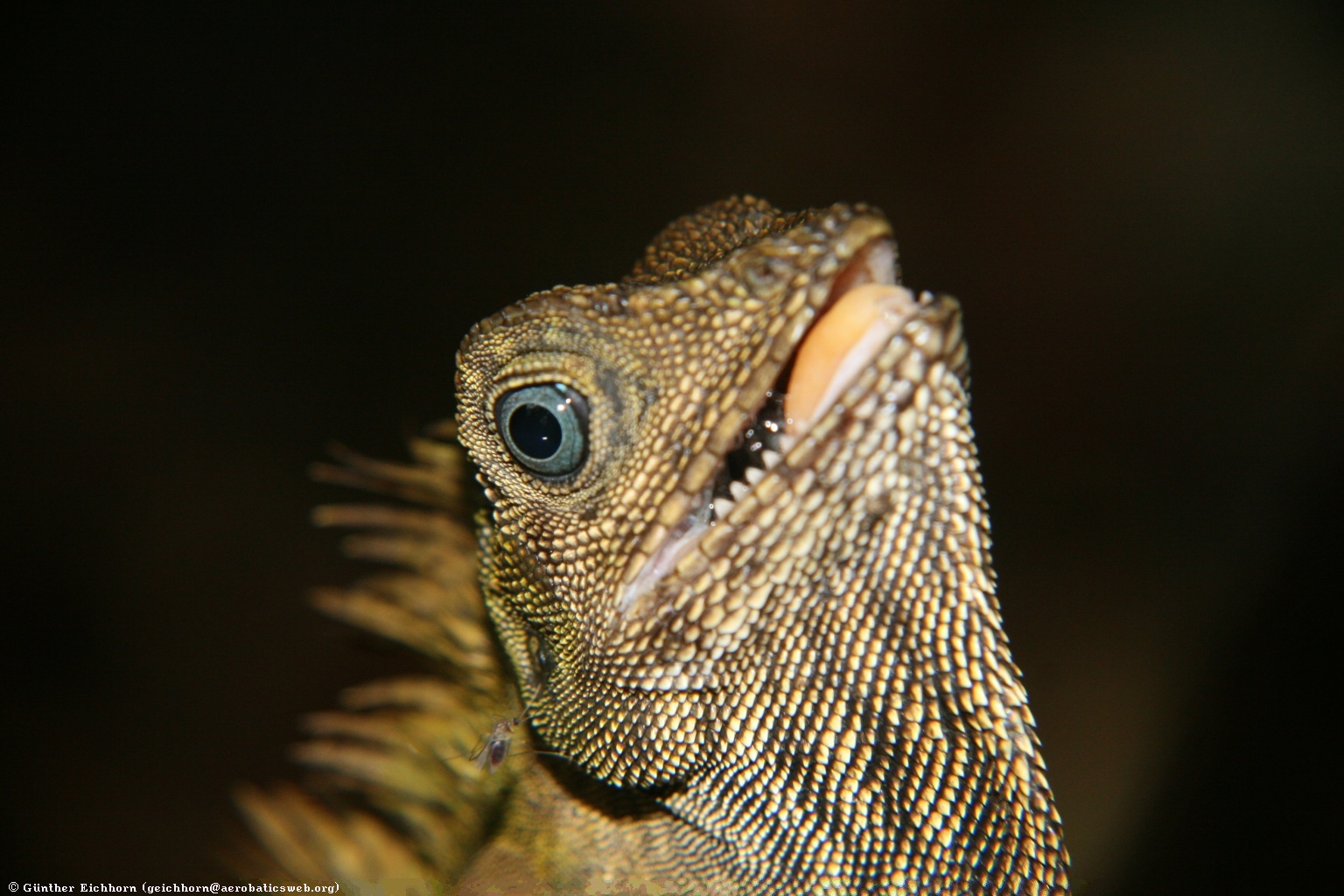
Lateral profile of head in threat display

Sub-adult males are generally brown, olive and green on dorsum with laterals, often with dark reticulations. Adult males are predominantly green with indistinct reticulation. Iris deep brown or light blue. Females rust red dorsolaterally with oval spots formed from reticulations on the sides of body.

== Distribution ==
Is endemic to Borneo. Found commonly in Mount Kinabalu, Poring Hot Spring in Sabah, also found in Brunei, Sarawak and Kalimantan.

== Ecology and Natural History ==
Found in primary and secondary rainforests up to 700 m (2,300 ft) a.s.l. Arboreal in habit, they live in tree trunks and on lianas often near streams. They deposit eggs in a small burrow dug on soil. Up to four eggs (length 22 mm each) are laid per clutch at intervals of three months.
