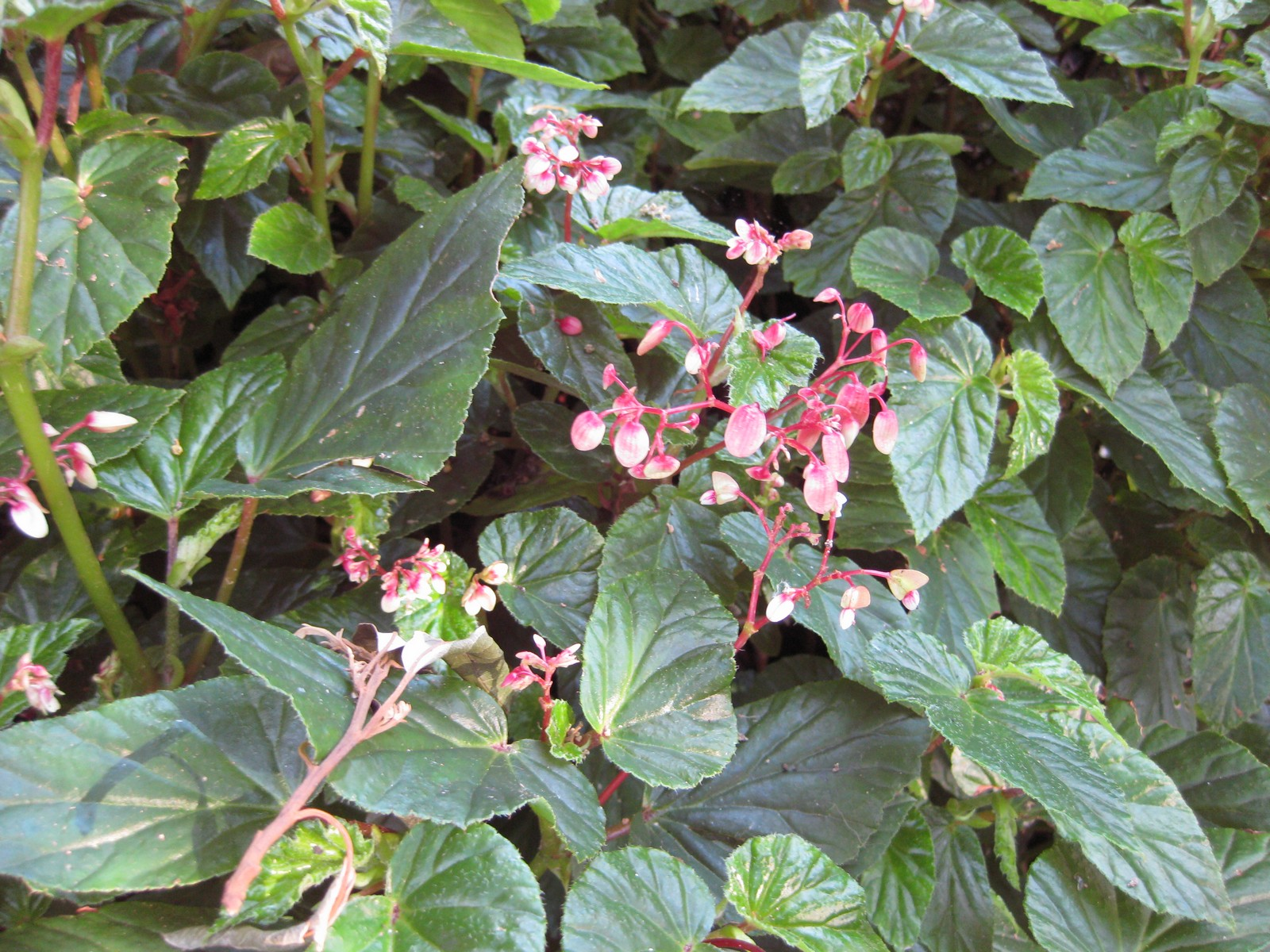
- Flowers
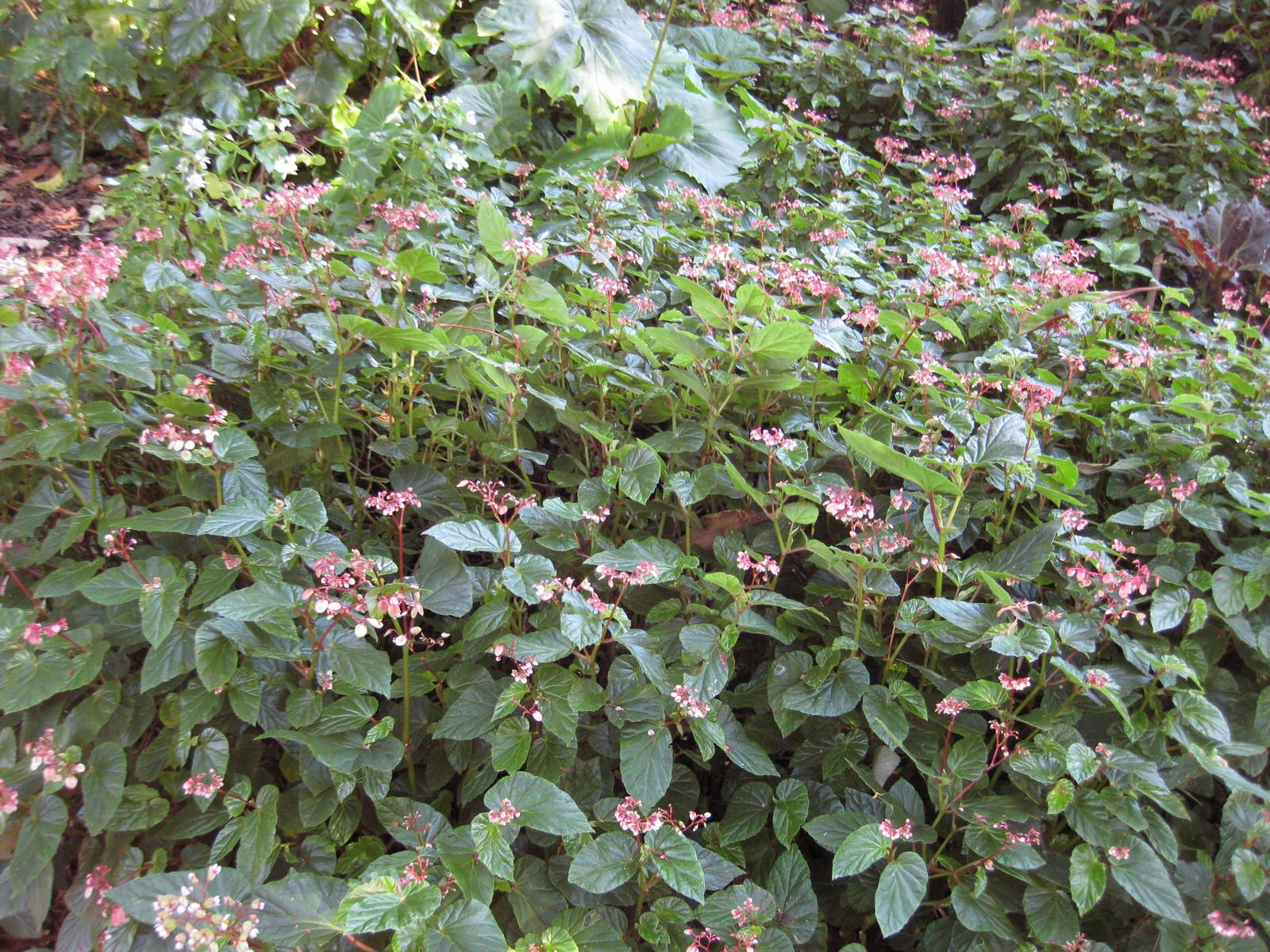
- Begonia domingensis is shrubby, and tends to spread wider than it is tall.

Scientific classification
- Kingdom: Plantae
- Clade: Tracheophytes
- Clade: Angiosperms
- Clade: Eudicots
- Clade: Rosids
- Order: Cucurbitales
- Family: Begoniaceae
- Genus: Begonia
- Species: B. domingensis

Binomial name
- Begonia domingensis A.DC.

Synonyms
- Begonia domingensis var. oligostemon Urb.

= Begonia domingensis =

Species of flowering plant

Begonia domingensis, the peanut-brittle begonia, is a species of flowering plant in the family Begoniaceae, native to the Dominican Republic. A bush or shrub begonia, it is occasionally cultivated, more for its well-behaved growth form than for its flowers or foliage.
