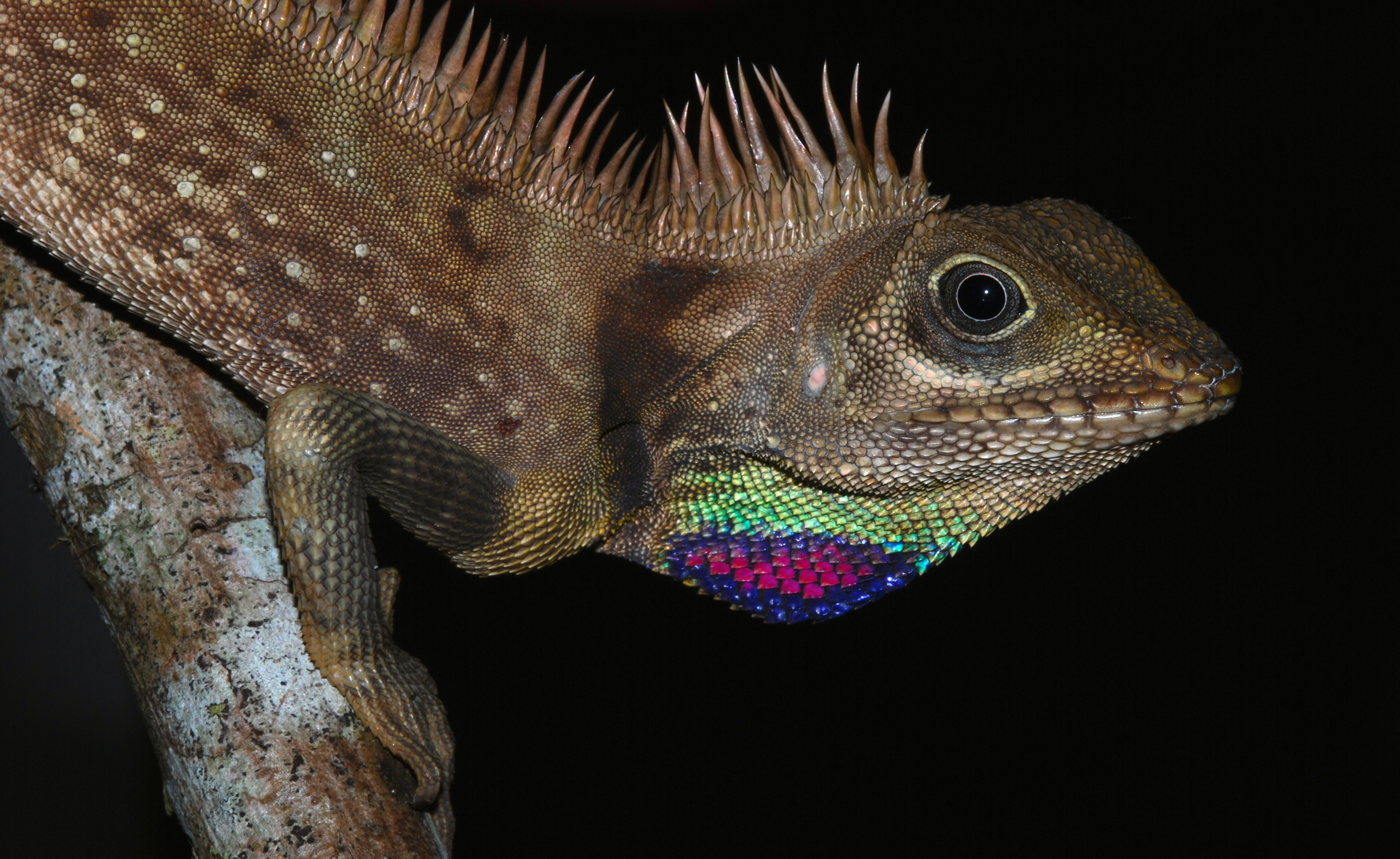
- Gonocephalus bellii

Scientific classification
- Kingdom: Animalia
- Phylum: Chordata
- Class: Reptilia
- Order: Squamata
- Suborder: Iguania
- Family: Agamidae
- Subfamily: Draconinae
- Genus: Gonocephalus; Kaup, 1825

Synonyms
- Agama (part), Arua, Coryphophylax, Dilophyrus, Galeotes, Goniocephalus [sic], Gonyocephalus [sic], Hypsilurus, Iguana (part), Lophosteus, Lophyrus, Tiaris

= Gonocephalus =

Genus of lizards

Gonocephalus is also a synonym of the catfish genus Clarotes.

Gonocephalus is a genus of agamid lizards endemic to southeast Asia.

== Taxonomy ==
Species from Melanesia and Australia which were formerly included in Gonocephalus are now placed in the genus Hypsilurus.

== Species ==
As of 2023, Gonocephalus contains the following 17 species:

Image	Scientific name	Common name	Distribution
	Gonocephalus bellii (A.M.C. Duméril & Bibron, 1837)	Bell's anglehead lizard, Bell's forest dragon	Thailand, Malacca, Perak, Pahang, Selangor, Indonesia (Borneo), and West Malaysia
	Gonocephalus beyschlagi (Boettger, 1892)	Sumatra forest dragon	Sumatra, Indonesia.
	Gonocephalus bornensis (Schlegel, 1848)	Borneo anglehead lizard, Borneo forest dragon	Sabah, Kinabalu, Brunei, Sarawak and Kalimantan
	Gonocephalus chamaeleontinus (Laurenti, 1768)	chameleon forest dragon, chameleon anglehead lizard	Indonesia and Malaysia
	Gonocephalus doriae (W. Peters, 1871)	Doria's angle-headed lizard	Borneo
	Gonocephalus grandis (Gray, 1845)	giant forest dragon, great anglehead lizard	Thailand, Vietnam, Malaysia, Indonesia, and Myanmar.
	Gonocephalus inauris Harvey, Sarker, Sidik, Kurniawan & E.N. Smith, 2023		Indonesia
	Gonocephalus interruptus (Boulenger, 1885)	Boulenger's forest dragon, Mindoro anglehead	Philippines.
	Gonocephalus klossi (Boulenger, 1920)	Kloss's forest dragon	Indonesia.
	Gonocephalus kuhlii (Schlegel, 1848)		Indonesia.
	Gonocephalus lacunosus Manthey & Denzer, 1991	Manthey's forest dragon	Indonesia.
	Gonocephalus liogaster (Günther, 1872)	tropical forest dragon, blue-eyed anglehead lizard, orange-ringed anglehead lizard,	Indonesia and Malaysia.
	Gonocephalus megalepis (Bleeker, 1860)	Bleeker's forest dragon	Indonesia.
	Gonocephalus mjobergi M.A. Smith, 1925		Indonesia and Malaysia.
	Gonocephalus pyrius Harvey, Reich, Riyanto, Kurniawan & E.N. Smith, 2021	angle-headed dragon	Sumatra.
	Gonocephalus semperi (W. Peters, 1867)	Mindoro forest dragon	Philippines.
	Gonocephalus sophiae (Gray, 1845)	Negros forest dragon	Philippines.

Nota bene: A binomial authority in parentheses indicates that the species was originally described in a genus other than Gonocephalus.
