= Furcy =

- Village
- Location in Haiti
- Coordinates: 18°24′43″N 72°18′20″W
- Country: Haiti
- Department: Ouest
- Arrondissement: Port-au-Prince
- Elevation: 1,534 m (5,033 ft)

Furcy is a small village near Kenscoff, 30 miles southeast of Port-au-Prince, Haiti.

== Hospitality ==
There are two accommodations in the area: The Lodge, a wooden chalet architecture hotel;Rustik, a bed and breakfast looking out on the mountainside in eco-friendly treehouse hotel/bar, built by the Furcy community after the 2010 earthquake.
