= List of amphibians of Java =

The following is a list of amphibians of Java and Bali, Indonesia from Iskandar (1998). There is a total of 41 amphibian species in Java, 9 of which are endemic to Java.

In Java, amphibian species commonly collected for human consumption include Limnonectes macrodon, Fejervarya cancrivora, Fejervarya limnocharis, and Fejervarya iskandari.

== List ==
Family Ichthyophiidae (Asiatic Tailed Caecilians)

- Ichthyophis hypocyaneus

Family Megophryidae (Litter Frogs)

- Leptobrachium hasseltii
- Megophrys montana

Family Bufonidae (True Toads)

- Leptophryne borbonica
- Leptophryne cruentata — endemic
- Phrynoidis asper
- Duttaphrynus melanostictus
- Ingerophrynus biporcatus
- Ingerophrynus parvus

Family Microhylidae (Narrow Mouth Frogs)

- Kalophrynus minusculus
- Kalophrynus pleurostigma
- Kaloula baleata
- Microhyla achatina
- Microhyla palmipes
- Oreophryne monticola — endemic to Bali and Lombok; not found on Java

Family Ranidae (True Frogs)

- Huia masonii — endemic
- Hylarana baramica
- Hylarana chalconota
- Hylarana erythraea
- Hylarana nicobariensis
- Odorrana hosii
- Rana catesbeiana — introduced

Family Dicroglossidae (Fork Tongue Frogs)

- Fejervarya cancrivora
- Fejervarya limnocharis
- Fejervarya iskandari — endemic
- Limnonectes kuhlii
- Limnonectes macrodon
- Limnonectes microdiscus
- Occidozyga lima
- Occidozyga sumatrana

Family Rhacophoridae (South Asian Tree Frogs)

- Nyctixalus margaritifer — endemic
- Philautus aurifasciatus
- Philautus jacobsoni — endemic
- Philautus pallidipes — endemic
- Philautus vittiger — endemic
- Polypedates leucomystax
- Rhacophorus javanus — endemic
- Rhacophorus margaritifer — endemic
- Rhacophorus reinwardtii

Family Hylidae (Australo-Papuan Tree Frogs)

- Litoria javana — dubious

Family Pipidae (African Clawed Toads)

- Xenopus laevis — introduced
- Hymenochirus sp. — introduced

== See also ==
- List of amphibians and reptiles of Mount Halimun Salak National Park
- List of amphibians of Sumatra
