= List of amphibians and reptiles of Mount Halimun Salak National Park =

Below is a list of amphibians and reptiles of Mount Halimun Salak National Park in West Java, Indonesia, drawn from Kurniati (2005).

== Amphibians ==
- Leptobrachium hasseltii — Java and nearby eastern islands
- Megophrys montana
- Leptophryne borbonica
- Leptophryne cruentata — endemic
- Phrynoidis asper
- Ingerophrynus biporcatus
- Duttaphrynus melanostictus
- Microhyla achatina — Java and southern Sumatra
- Huia masonii — endemic
- Hylarana chalconota
- Hylarana erythraea
- Hylarana nicobariensis
- Odorrana hosii
- Fejervarya cancrivora
- Fejervarya limnocharis
- Limnonectes kuhlii
- Limnonectes macrodon
- Limnonectes microdiscus — Java and southern Sumatra
- Occidozyga sumatrana
- Nyctixalus margaritifer — endemic
- Philautus aurifasciatus
- Philautus vittiger — endemic
- Polypedates leucomystax
- Rhacophorus javanus — endemic
- Rhacophorus reinwardtii

== Reptiles ==
=== Lizards ===
- Cyrtodactylus marmoratus
- Gehyra mutilata
- Hemidactylus frenatus
- Draco jimbriatus hennigi
- Draco haematopogon
- Draco volans
- Bronchocela cristatella
- Bronchocela jubata
- Gonocephalus chamaeleontinus
- Gonocephalus kuhlii
- Pseudocalotes tympanistriga
- Tachydromus sexlineatus
- Mabuya multifasciata
- Sphenomorphus puncticentralis
- Sphenomorphus sanctus
- Sphenomorphus temmincki

=== Snakes ===
- Python reticulatus
- Ahaetulla prasina
- Aplopeltura boa
- Calamaria lumbricoidea
- Calamaria schlegelii
- Dendrelaphis pictus
- Liopeltis baliodeirus
- Liopeltis tricolor
- Psammodynastes pulverulentus
- Rhabdophis chrysargos
- Rhabdophis subminiatus
- Xenochrophis trianguligerus
- Xenodermus javanicus
- Bungarus candidus
- Trimeresurus puniceus

== See also ==
- List of amphibians of Java
- List of amphibians of Sumatra
