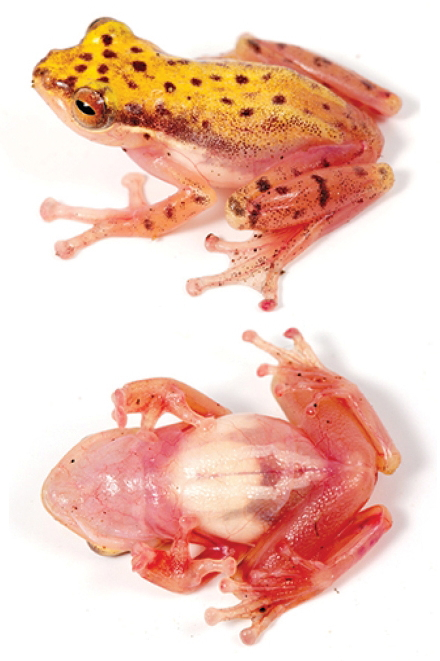

Scientific classification
- Kingdom: Animalia
- Phylum: Chordata
- Class: Amphibia
- Order: Anura
- Family: Rhacophoridae
- Genus: Feihyla
- Species: F. inexpectata

Binomial name
- Feihyla inexpectata (Matsui, Shimada, and Sudin, 2014)

Synonyms
- Chiromantis inexpectatus Matsui, Shimada, and Sudin, 2014

= Feihyla inexpectata =

Species of frog

Feihyla inexpectata is a species of frog in the family Rhacophoridae. This recently (2014) described species is endemic to Malaysian Borneo and known from its type locality in the Maliau Basin Conservation Area, Sandakan Division, Sabah and from Danum Valley, also in Sabah. Common name Bornean opposite-fingered tree frog has been coined for it.

== Etymology ==
The specific name inexpectata is Latin and refers to the fact that finding a species of the genus Chiromantis, as the species was originally assigned to, was considered unexpected in Borneo given that the genus was previously only known from continental South-East Asia.

Chiromantis inexpectatus is only known from two locations in Sabah, Borneo.

== Description ==
The type series consists of two adult males and a metamorphosing juvenile. The adult males measured 22.2–22.4 mm (0.87–0.88 in) in snout–vent length (SVL). The metamorph measured 17.9 mm (0.70 in) SVL and had a tiny tail stump. Females are unknown.

The head is wider than the body. The snout is truncated in the side view and sloping anteroventrally. The canthus rostralis is rounded. The eyes are large and protuberant. The tympanumis distinct and subcircular (not visible in the metamorph). The forelimbs are long and relatively robust. The fingers have expanded discs and are less than half-webbed (no webbing at all between the first two fingers). The hindlimbs are comparatively short (though still longer than the body). The toes bear expanded discs and are webbed. Skin is smooth except for some minute, blunt asperities in the back. The coloration is changeable, varying between whitish-yellow on body and pinkish on limbs to light brown. There are scattered, small dark-brown spots on the back. A dark lateral band runs from the tip of the snout over upper half of tympanum to about one-half way down the body and is bordered under by a narrower white stripe. The ventrum is semitransparent and immaculate creamy white.

== Habitat ==
The type series was collected at night when the frogs were perching on leaves of low trees (no higher than 1 metre) that extended above the surface of a shallow pool at an elevation of 1,050 m (3,440 ft) above sea level. Neither tadpole, egg masses, nor calling males were found, suggesting that breeding takes place at other times of the year than the time of observation, early March. Frog species sharing the same habitat included Rhacophorus borneensis, Kurixalus appendiculatus, Polypedates macrotis, and Microhyla petrigena. Rhacophorus borneensis was described based on specimens from the same pool.

== Conservation ==
As of late 2017, the species has not been assessed by the International Union for Conservation of Nature. The type locality, Maliau Basin Conservation Area, is not easy accessible.
