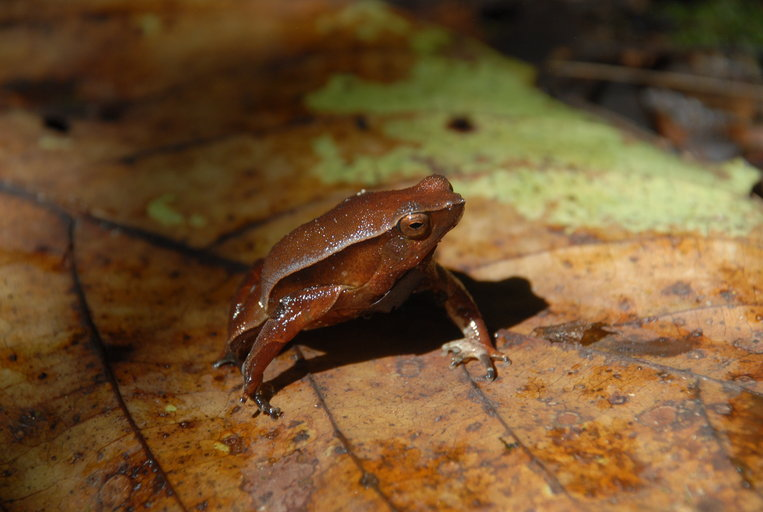
- Kalophrynus pleurostigma

Scientific classification
- Domain: Eukaryota
- Kingdom: Animalia
- Phylum: Chordata
- Class: Amphibia
- Order: Anura
- Family: Microhylidae
- Subfamily: Kalophryninae; Mivart, 1869
- Genus: Kalophrynus; Tschudi, 1838

Diversity
- 26 species (see text)

= Kalophrynus =

Genus of amphibians

Kalophrynus is a genus of microhylid frogs. It is the only genus in the subfamily Kalophryninae. The species in this genus are found in southern China, in Southeast Asia to Java and Philippines, and in Assam, India.

== Species ==
There are 25 species:

- Kalophrynus anya Zug, 2015
- Kalophrynus baluensis Kiew, 1984
- Kalophrynus barioensis Matsui and Nishikawa, 2011
- Kalophrynus bunguranus (Günther, 1895)
- Kalophrynus calciphilus Dehling, 2011
- Kalophrynus cryptophonus Vassilieva, Galoyan, Gogoleva, and Poyarkov, 2014
- Kalophrynus eok Das and Haas, 2003
- Kalophrynus heterochirus Boulenger, 1900
- Kalophrynus honbaensis Vassilieva, Galoyan, Gogoleva, and Poyarkov, 2014
- Kalophrynus interlineatus (Blyth, 1855)
- Kalophrynus intermedius Inger, 1966
- Kalophrynus kiewi Matsui, Eto, Belabut, and Nishikawa, 2017
- Kalophrynus limbooliati Matsui, Nishikawa, Belabut, Norhayati, and Yong, 2012
- Kalophrynus meizon Zug, 2015
- Kalophrynus menglienicus Yang and Su, 1980
- Kalophrynus minusculus Iskandar, 1998
- Kalophrynus nubicola Dring, 1983
- Kalophrynus orangensis Dutta, Ahmed, and Das, 2000
- Kalophrynus palmatissimus Kiew, 1984
- Kalophrynus pleurostigma Tschudi, 1838
- Kalophrynus punctatus Peters, 1871
- Kalophrynus robinsoni Smith, 1922
- Kalophrynus sinensis Peters, 1867
- Kalophrynus subterrestris Inger, 1966
- Kalophrynus tiomanensis Chan, Grismer, and Grismer, 2011
- Kalophrynus yongi Matsui, 2009
