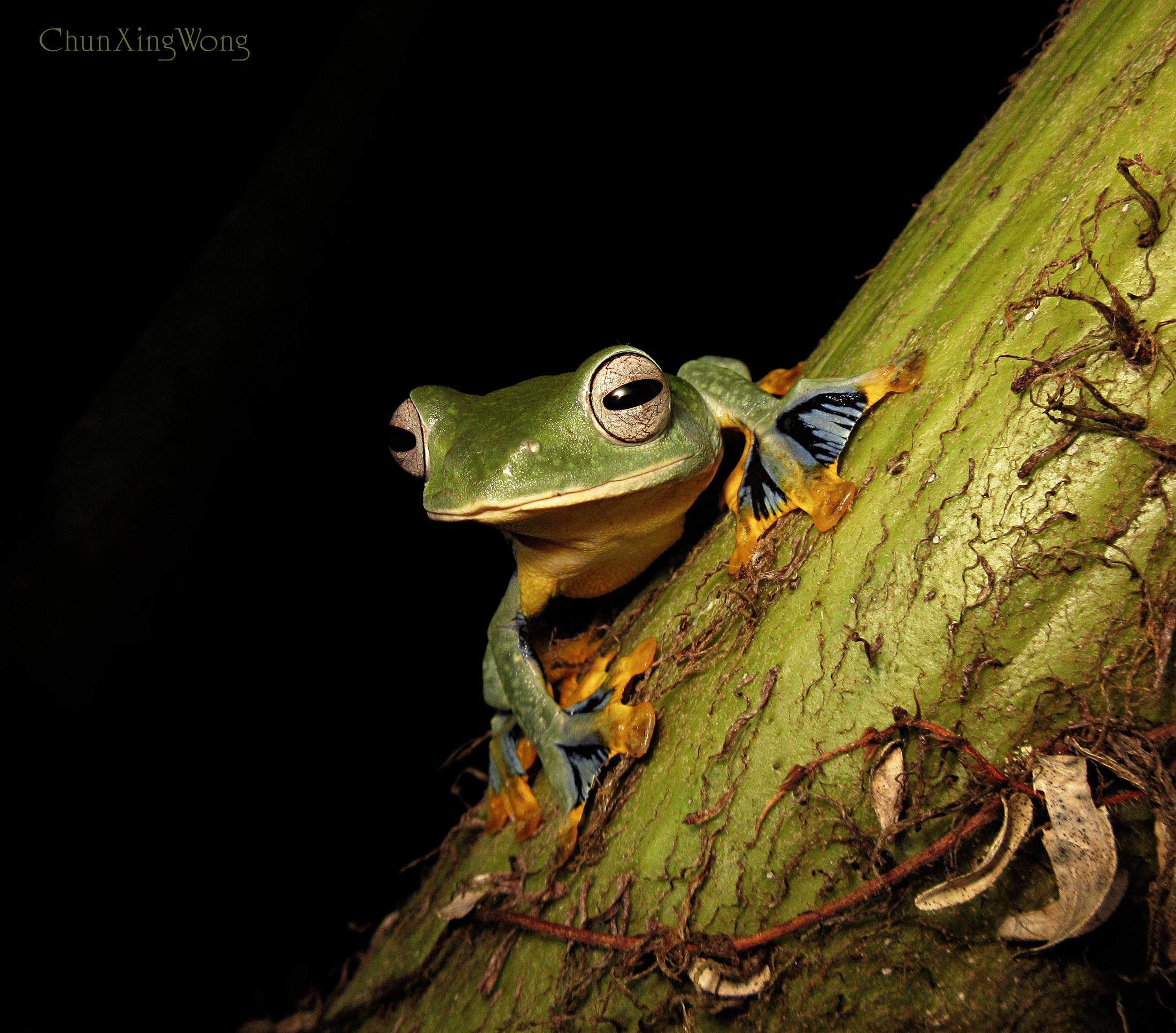

Scientific classification
- Kingdom: Animalia
- Phylum: Chordata
- Class: Amphibia
- Order: Anura
- Family: Rhacophoridae
- Genus: Rhacophorus
- Species: R. borneensis

Binomial name
- Rhacophorus borneensis Matsui, Shimada, and Sudin, 2013

= Rhacophorus borneensis =

Species of frog

Rhacophorus borneensis is a species of frog in the family Rhacophoridae. This recently (2013) described species is endemic to Malaysian Borneo where it is known from its type locality in the Maliau Basin Conservation Area, Sandakan Division, Sabah as well as from the Batang Ai National Park, Sarawak. Prior to its description, it was included in Rhacophorus reinwardtii. It is said to be "one of the prettiest frogs of Borneo". Common name Borneo flying frog has been coined for it.

Rhacophorus borneensis is only known from two locations in Malaysian Borneo.

== Description ==
The type series consists of an adult male and female in amplexus. The male measured 51 mm (2.0 in) in snout–vent length (SVL) and the female 62 mm (2.4 in). Literature records for Bornean "Rhacophorus reinwardtii", likely representing this species, give a range 46–55 mm (1.8–2.2 in) for males and 56–65 mm (2.2–2.6 in) for females.

The body is dorsoventrally compressed. The snout is rounded dorsally and sloping downwards in profile. The eyes are large and protuberant. The canthus is distinct and blunt. The tympanum is distinct and subcircular; the supra-tympanic fold is oblique. The fingers and toes have large discs and are broadly webbed. The dorsum is smooth and uniformly green, although some specimens may have dark spots. The lips are white. The lower parts are immaculate yellowish orange, with chin mottled with small, back spots. The webbing is dorsally black with fine blue streaks.

The male advertisement call is a low chuckle, likened to a woodpecker.

== Habitat ==
The type series, a pair in amplexus, was collected at night when the frogs were perching on a tree branch that extended above the surface of a shallow pool at an elevation of 1,050 m (3,440 ft) above sea level. No tadpoles nor eggs were found. Frog species sharing the same habitat included Chiromantis inexpectatus, Kurixalus appendiculatus, Polypedates macrotis, and Microhyla petrigena. Chiromantis inexpectatus was described based on specimens from the same pool. Outside breeding season, Rhacophorus borneensis live high up in the canopy and are difficult to observe. The species is found in primary forest as well as in secondary or disturbed forest.

== Conservation ==
As of late 2017, the species had not been assessed by the International Union for Conservation of Nature. The type locality, Maliau Basin Conservation Area, is not easy accessible, whereas the other known locality is a protected area, Batang Ai National Park.
