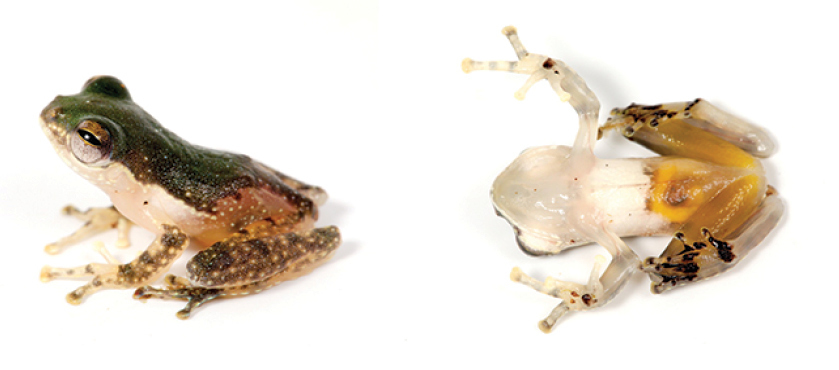
- Dorsolateral and ventral views of the same individual

Conservation status
- Least Concern (IUCN 3.1)

Scientific classification
- Kingdom: Animalia
- Phylum: Chordata
- Class: Amphibia
- Order: Anura
- Family: Rhacophoridae
- Genus: Feihyla
- Species: F. kajau

Binomial name
- Feihyla kajau (Dring, 1983)

Synonyms
- Rhacophorus kajau Dring, 1983

= Feihyla kajau =

Species of frog

Feihyla kajau, also known as the Dring's flying frog, white-eared tree frog, and white-eared jelly-nest frog, is a species of frog in the family Rhacophoridae. It is endemic to Borneo and found in all major jurisdictions of the island Kalimantan (Indonesia), Sabah and Sarawak (Malaysia), and Brunei. The specific name kajau is Berawan for "charming".

== Description ==
Males grow to 20 mm (0.8 in) in snout–vent length while females can reach larger sizes. The body is slender. The snout is very short and blunt. The tympanum is small and inconspicuous. The finger and toe tips are broadly rounded. The outer fingers have basal webbing the toes are half-webbed. Skin is dorsally finely shagreened. The dorsum is green above, abruptly ending at flanks, and brown posteriorly in the pelvic region, scattered white dots above. The venter is white anteriorly and transparent posteriorly. The iris is silvery below and golden above, with some dark reticulation and golden ring around pupil that is horizontally oval.

The male advertisement call is soft and high-pitched. Dorsum of tadpoles is brown with scattering of light bronze pigmentation on trunk and forehead. Underside of the tadpole is transparent and internal organs are visible. Tadpoles reach up to 26.7 mm (1.1 in) in total length. Eyes are positioned dorsolaterally.

== Habitat and conservation ==
Feihyla kajau occurs in primary and slightly disturbed lowland rainforests in flat and hilly terrain at elevations below 700 m (2,300 ft) above sea level, sometimes to 1,000 m (3,300 ft). Individuals can be found perching on low vegetation overhanging small, rocky streams or swampy, muddy pools. Eggs are laid on the surface of leaves in clutches of approximately 7–10.

Feihyla kajau can be common in suitable habitat. Parts of its range are threatened by logging concessions, small scale subsistence logging, oil palm plantations, and property development. It is present in a number of protected areas.
