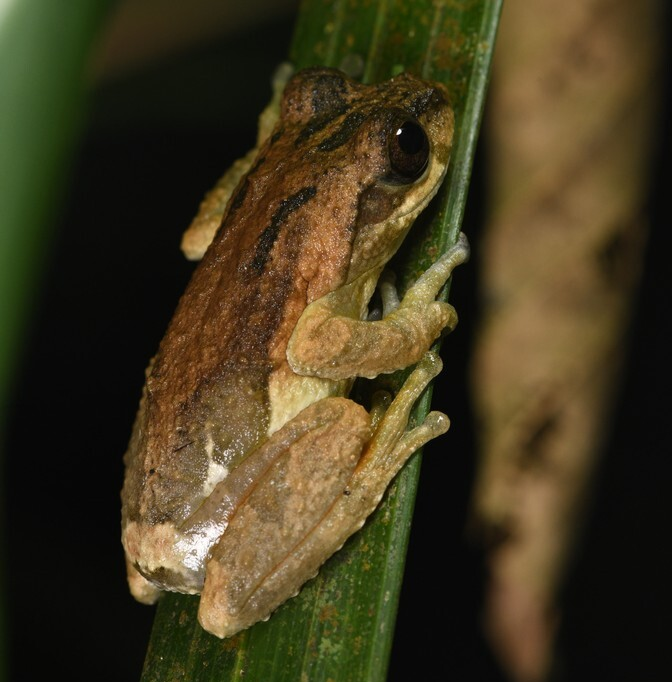

Conservation status
- Least Concern (IUCN 3.1)

Scientific classification
- Kingdom: Animalia
- Phylum: Chordata
- Class: Amphibia
- Order: Anura
- Family: Rhacophoridae
- Genus: Feihyla
- Species: F. palpebralis

Binomial name
- Feihyla palpebralis (Smith, 1924)

Synonyms
- Philautus palpebralis Smith, 1924; Chirixalus palpebralis (Smith, 1924)

= Feihyla palpebralis =

Species of frog

Feihyla palpebralis is a species of frog in the family Rhacophoridae, sometimes known as the Vietnamese bubble-nest frog or the white-cheeked small treefrog. In addition to its type locality, Langbian Plateau in southeastern Vietnam, it may have been found in southern China (southern Yunnan and western Guizhou) and northern Vietnam south to Tam Dao, though some of these may have been misidentifications, and it is expected to be found in the intervening Laos and Vietnam.

Males from China are reported to grow to a snout–vent length of about 27 mm (1.1 in). Males from the Central Highlands of Vietnam are reported to have a snout–vent length of 24–26 mm (0.94–1.02 in) and females 29–32 mm (1.1–1.3 in). A late-stage tadpole measured 37 mm (1.5 in).

Natural habitats of Feihyla palpebralis are pools and swampy riparian areas in forests; its habitat outside the breeding season is poorly known. They lay single eggs on plant stems above water. Reproductive season in the Central Highlands of Vietnam is April–May.

This species is threatened by habitat loss caused by forest degradation associated with agriculture, especially cash crops like coffee, rubber, and tea.
