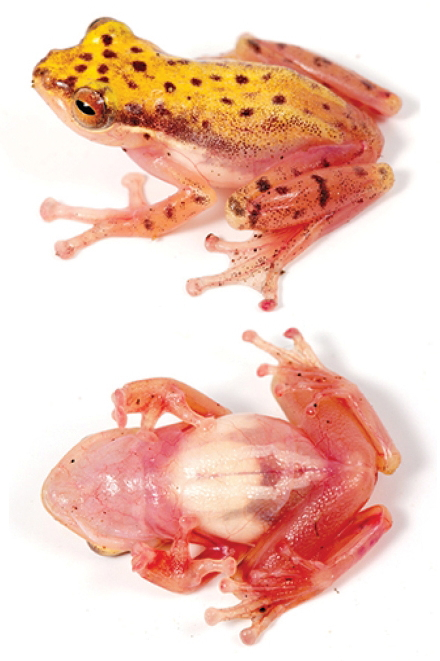
- Feihyla inexpectata

Scientific classification
- Kingdom: Animalia
- Phylum: Chordata
- Class: Amphibia
- Order: Anura
- Family: Rhacophoridae
- Subfamily: Rhacophorinae
- Genus: Feihyla; Frost et al., 2006

Type species
- Philautus palpebalis Smith, 1924

Species
- 6, see text

= Feihyla =

Genus of frogs

Feihyla is a genus of frogs in the family Rhacophoridae, subfamily Rhacophorinae. They are found in southern China and Vietnam, and likely also in Laos. Its phylogenetic position is not yet fully resolved, but it is probably the sister taxon to Taruga, Polypedates, and Rhacophorus. Feihyla was originally erected to resolve polyphyly of Chirixalus by absorbing "Chirixalus palpebralis".

== Description ==
The synapomorphy diagnosing Feihyla is its reproductive mode, laying eggs in a jelly containing some bubbles.

== Species ==
The following species are recognized in the genus Feihyla:

- Feihyla fuhua Fei, Ye, and Jiang, 2010
- Feihyla inexpectata (Matsui, Shimada, and Sudin, 2014)
- Feihyla kajau (Dring, 1983)
- Feihyla palpebralis (Smith, 1924)
- Feihyla samkosensis (Grismer, Neang, Chav, and Holden, 2007)
- Feihyla vittiger (Boulenger, 1897)
- Feihyla wenshanensis Liu et al., 2026
- Feihyla zhaotongensis Liu et al., 2026
