= Nanohyla hongiaoensis =

Scientific classification
- Kingdom: Animalia
- Phylum: Chordata
- Class: Amphibia
- Order: Anura
- Family: Microhylidae
- Genus: Nanohyla
- Species: N. hongiaoensis

Binomial name
- Nanohyla hongiaoensis (Hoang, Nguyen, Luong, Nguyen, Orlov, Chen, Wang & Jiang, 2020)

Synonyms
- Microhyla hongiaoensis Hoang, Nguyen, Luong, Nguyen, Orlov, Chen, Wang & Jiang, 2020

Species of frog

Nanohyla hongiaoensis is a species of frog in the family Microhylidae. It is also known as the Hongiao narrow-mouth frog. It is only known from Bidoup Nui Ba National Park in Lam Dong Province, Vietnam. Little is known about the species or its distribution and so it is likely to be rated data deficient by the IUCN Red List.

Nanohyla hongiaoensis is superficially similar to N. pulchella, but N. hongiaoensis is smaller and has differences in coloration.

== Taxonomy ==
Nanohyla hongiaoensis was originally described as Microhyla hongiaoensis, but a 2021 study using morphological and phylogenetic evidence moved nine species (including N. hongiaoensis) to a new genus, Nanohyla.

Both the Hongiao narrow-mouth frog and its scientific specific epithet, hongiaoensis, are named for the type locality of the species, the Hon Giao forest in Bidoup Nui Ba National Park.
