= Nanohyla annectens =

Conservation status
- Vulnerable (IUCN 3.1)

Scientific classification
- Kingdom: Animalia
- Phylum: Chordata
- Class: Amphibia
- Order: Anura
- Family: Microhylidae
- Genus: Nanohyla
- Species: N. annectens

Binomial name
- Nanohyla annectens (Boulenger, 1900)

Synonyms
- Microhyla annectens Boulenger, 1900

Species of amphibian

Nanohyla annectens, the Larut Hills rice frog, is a species of frog in the family Microhylidae. It is found in Peninsular Malaysia; records from Thailand and elsewhere probably refer to other species. Its natural habitats are evergreen submontane and montane rainforests. It lives on the forest floor and in puddles and breeds in temporary pools. It is locally threatened by habitat loss.

== Taxonomy ==
The Larut Hills rice frog used to be placed in the genus Microhyla, but a 2021 study using morphological and phylogenetic evidence moved nine species (including N. annectens) to a new genus, Nanohyla.
