= Kalophrynus palmatissimus =

Conservation status
- Endangered (IUCN 3.1)

Scientific classification
- Kingdom: Animalia
- Phylum: Chordata
- Class: Amphibia
- Order: Anura
- Family: Microhylidae
- Genus: Kalophrynus
- Species: K. palmatissimus

Binomial name
- Kalophrynus palmatissimus Kiew, 1984

Species of frog

Kalophrynus palmatissimus is a species of frog in the family Microhylidae. It is endemic to Malaysia. Its natural habitat is subtropical or tropical moist lowland forests. It is threatened by habitat loss.
