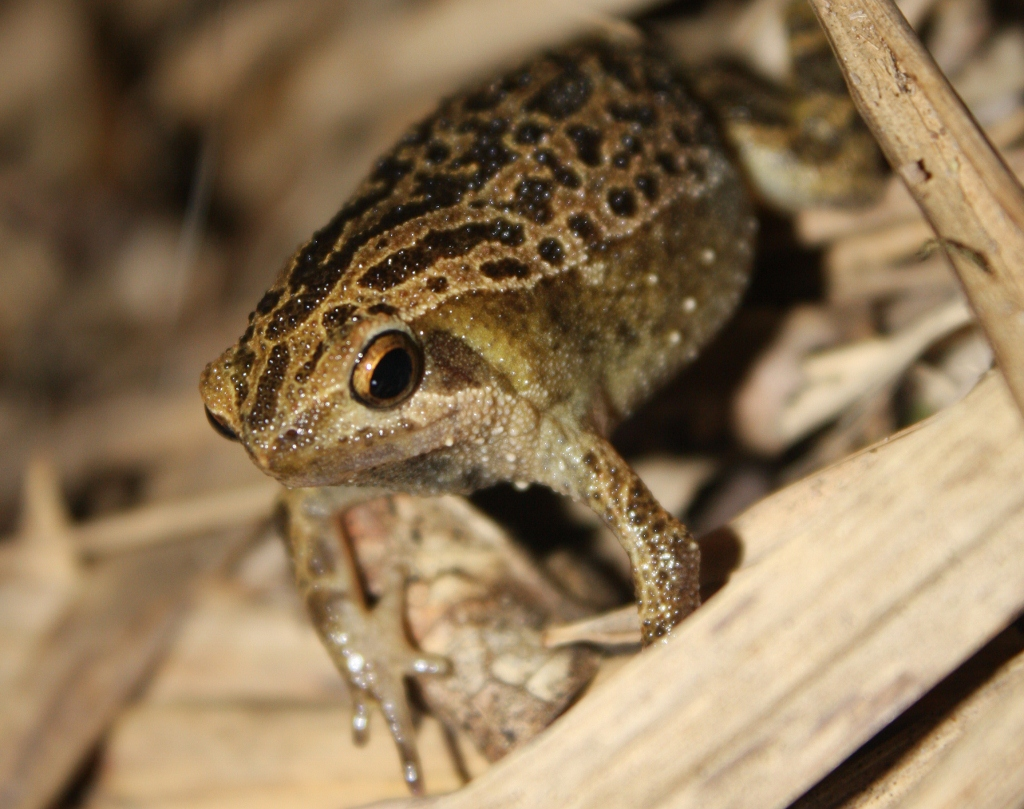

Conservation status
- Least Concern (IUCN 3.1)

Scientific classification
- Kingdom: Animalia
- Phylum: Chordata
- Class: Amphibia
- Order: Anura
- Family: Microhylidae
- Genus: Kalophrynus
- Species: K. interlineatus

Binomial name
- Kalophrynus interlineatus (Blyth, 1855)

Synonyms
- Kalophrynus orangensis Dutta, Ahmed, and Das, 2000

= Kalophrynus interlineatus =

Spotted narrow-mouthed frog

Species of amphibian

Kalophrynus interlineatus, commonly known as the spotted narrow-mouthed frog, is a species of narrow-mouthed frog found in India and South East Asia including Hong Kong.

== Photos ==
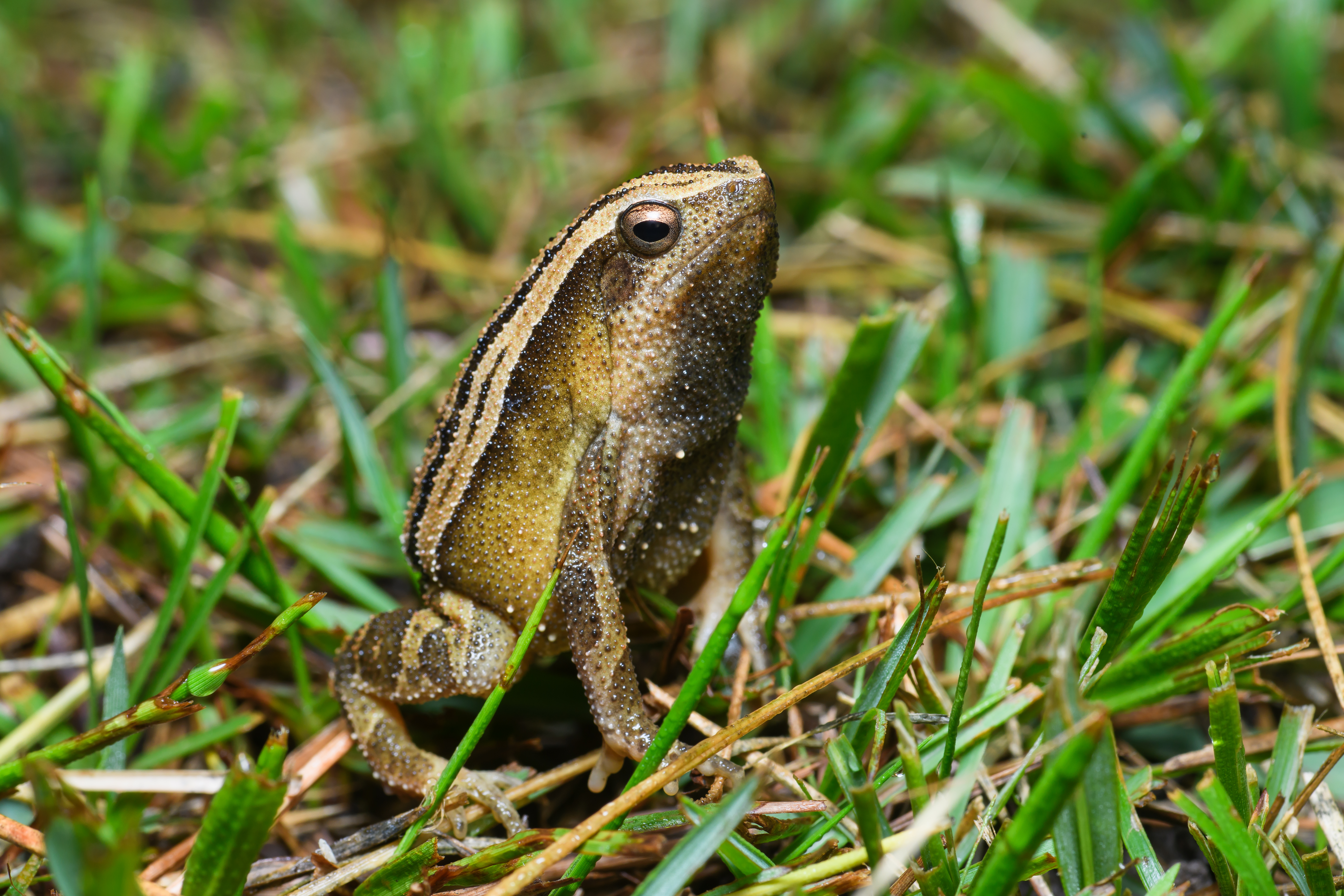
Kalophrynus interlineatus - Phu Kradueng National Park

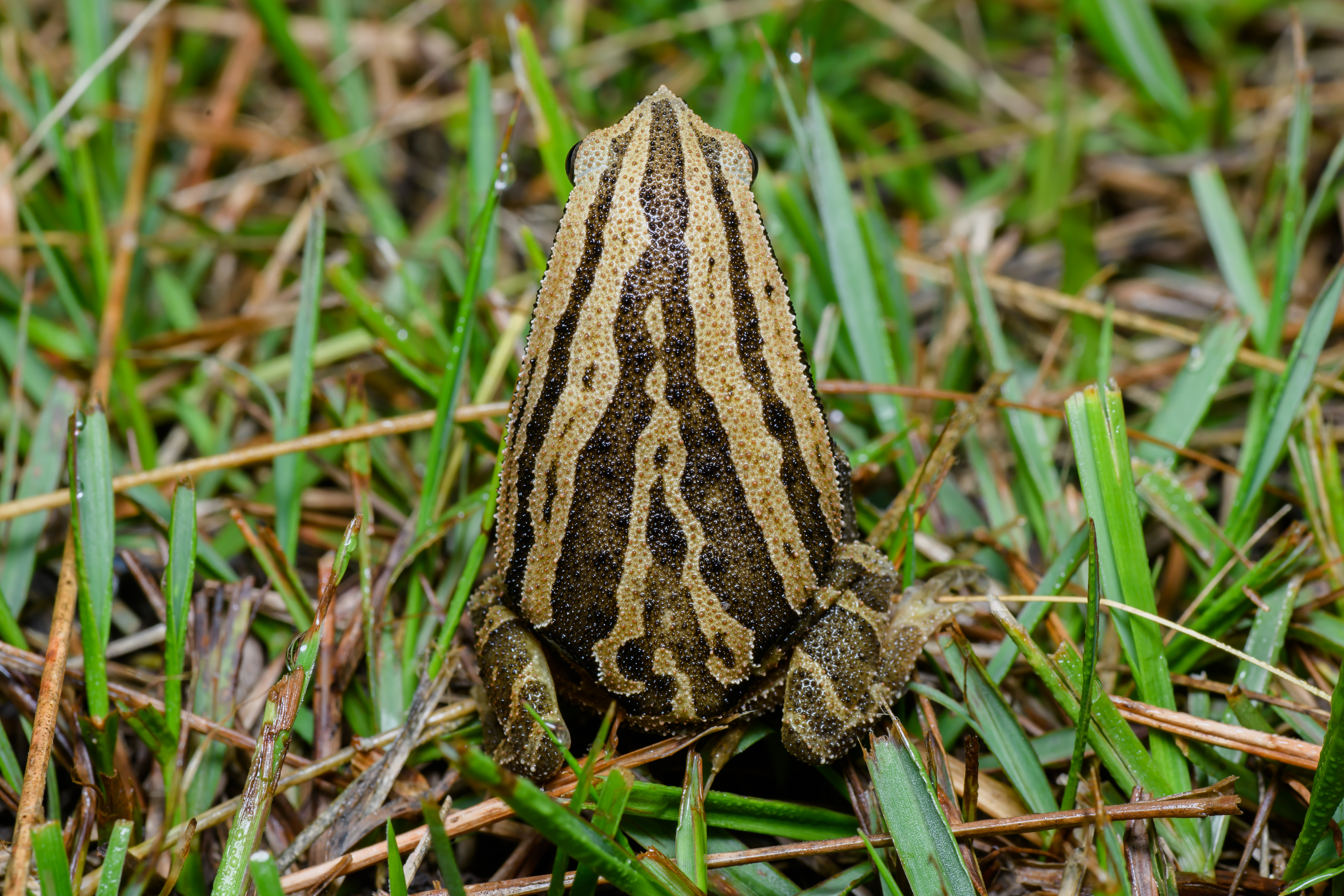
Kalophrynus interlineatus - Phu Kradueng National Park

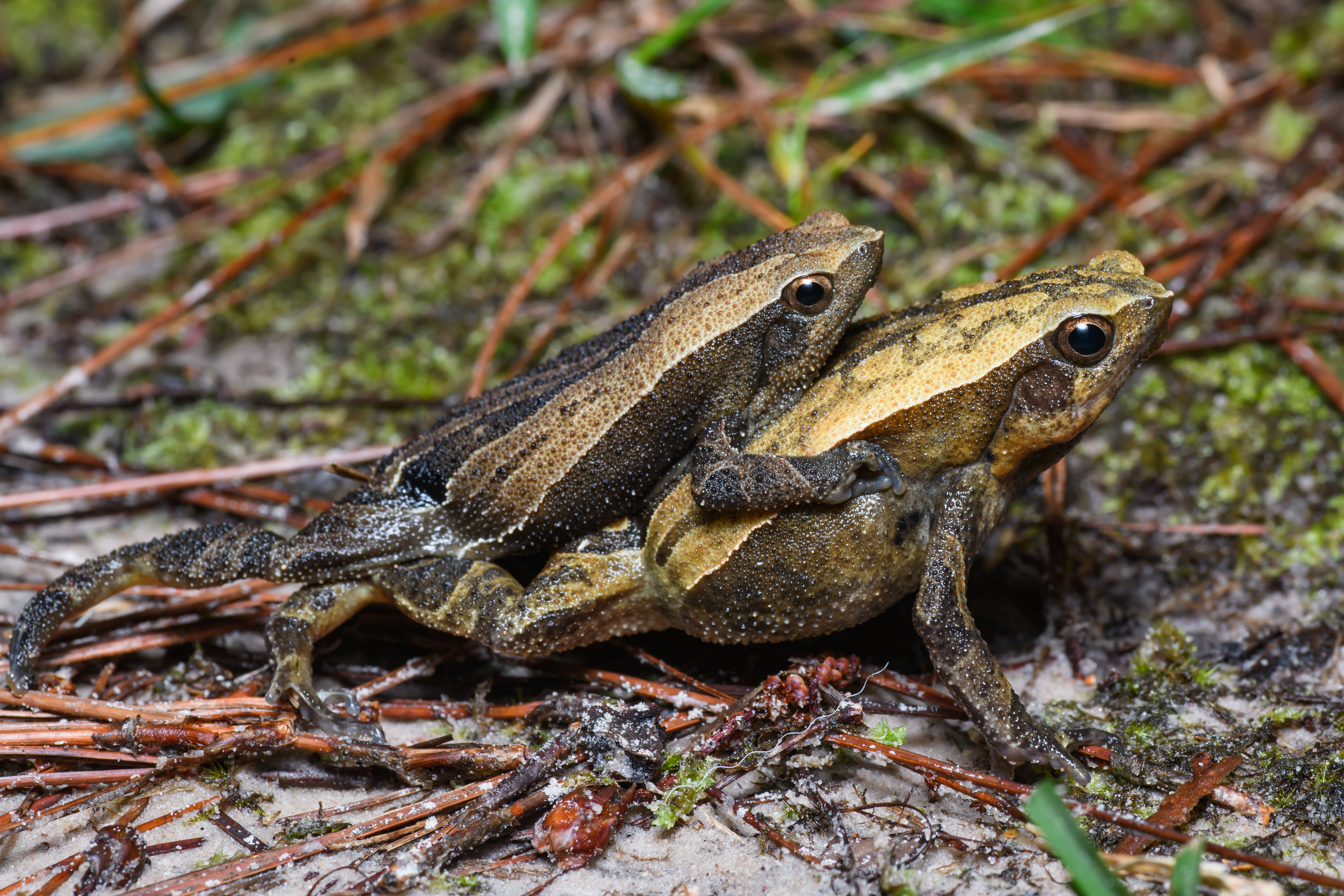
Kalophrynus interlineatus (mating) - Phu Kradueng National Park
