= Nanohyla nanapollexa =

Conservation status
- Data Deficient (IUCN 3.1)

Scientific classification
- Kingdom: Animalia
- Phylum: Chordata
- Class: Amphibia
- Order: Anura
- Family: Microhylidae
- Genus: Nanohyla
- Species: N. nanapollexa

Binomial name
- Nanohyla nanapollexa (Bain and Truong, 2004)

Synonyms
- Microhyla nanapollexa Bain and Truong, 2004

Species of frog

Nanohyla nanapollexa is a species of frog in the family Microhylidae. It is also known as the no-thumb pigmy frog and three-fingered pigmy narrow-mouth frog. It is endemic to Vietnam and is known from Quang Nam and Phu Yen Provinces.

== Taxonomy ==
N. nanapollexa was formerly placed in the genus Microhyla, but a 2021 study using morphological and phylogenetic evidence moved nine species (including N. nanapollexa) to a new genus, Nanohyla.

== Habitat and conservation ==
The type locality of Nanohyla nanapollexa is a montane broad-leaved evergreen forest with small mixed coniferous areas at 1,480 m (4,860 ft) above sea level. N. nanapollexa is considered data deficient by the IUCN Red List.
