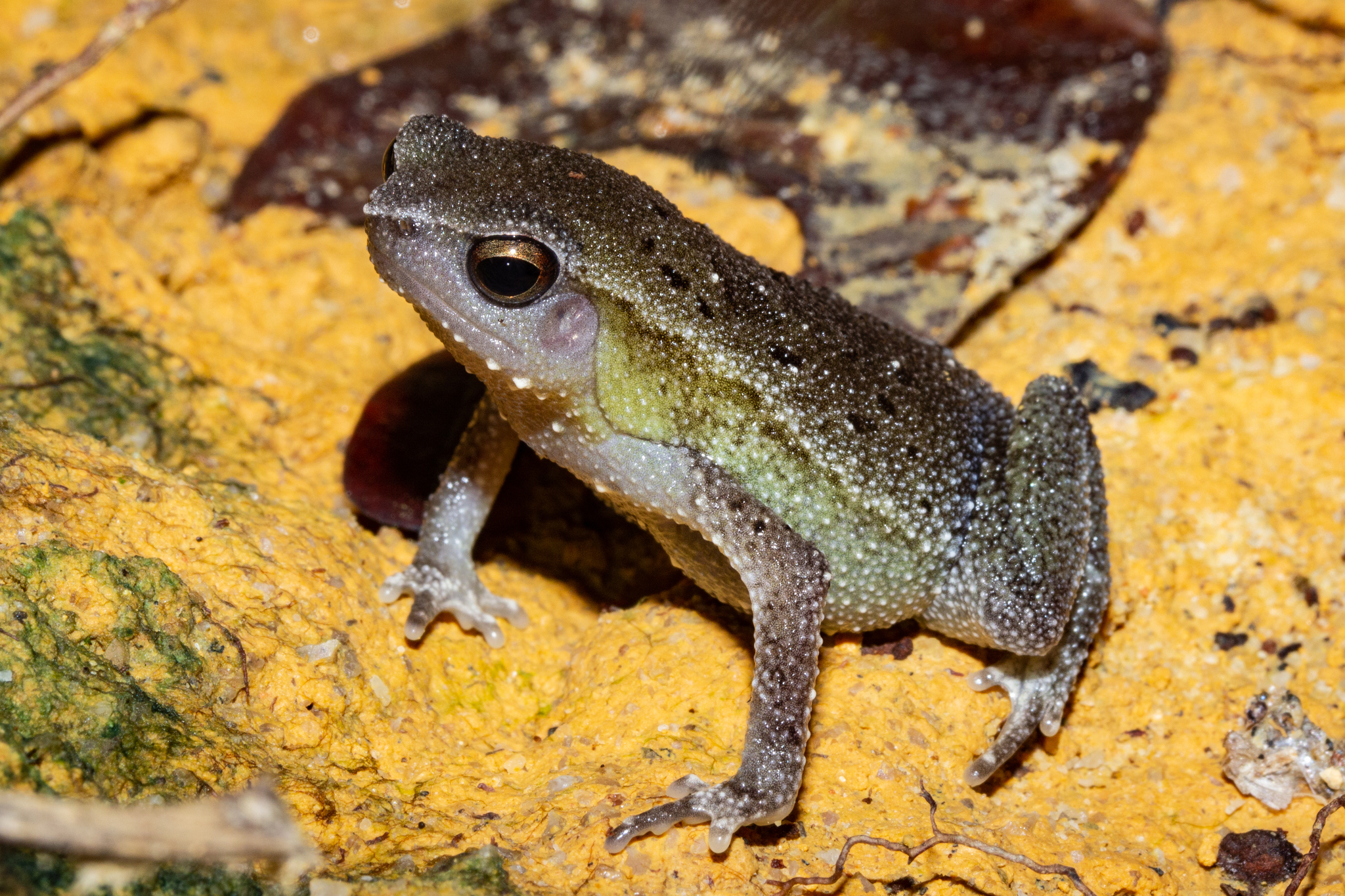

Conservation status
- Least Concern (IUCN 3.1)

Scientific classification
- Kingdom: Animalia
- Phylum: Chordata
- Class: Amphibia
- Order: Anura
- Family: Microhylidae
- Genus: Kalophrynus
- Species: K. punctatus

Binomial name
- Kalophrynus punctatus Peters, 1871

Synonyms
- Calophrynus punctatus Peters, 1871

= Kalophrynus punctatus =

Species of frog

Kalophrynus punctatus, commonly called the dotted grainy frog or spotted sticky frog, is a species of frog in the family Microhylidae. It is found in Indonesia and Malaysia. Its natural habitats are subtropical or tropical moist lowland forests and intermittent freshwater marshes. It is threatened by habitat loss.
