= Kalophrynus yongi =

Conservation status
- Critically Endangered (IUCN 3.1)

Scientific classification
- Kingdom: Animalia
- Phylum: Chordata
- Class: Amphibia
- Order: Anura
- Family: Microhylidae
- Genus: Kalophrynus
- Species: K. yongi

Binomial name
- Kalophrynus yongi Matsui, 2009
- Kalophrynus yongi is only known from near the top of Gunung Brinchang in Peninsular Malaysia

Species of frog

Kalophrynus yongi is a species of frog in the family Microhylidae, also known as the Cameron Highland sticky frog. It is endemic to Peninsular Malaysia and is only known from its type locality near the top of Gunung Brinchang (=Mount Brinchang), in the Cameron Highlands, Pahang state. The specific name yongi honours Dr. Yong Hoi-Sen, a zoologist from the University of Malaya.

== Description ==
Adult males measure 29–31 mm (1.1–1.2 in) in snout–vent length; the size of females is unknown. The overall appearance is stocky. The head is triangular, wider than it is long. The snout is obtusely pointed in dorsal view and truncate in profile. The canthus rostralis is distinct, as is the tympanum. The forelimbs are comparatively long and very stout; the fingers have rounded tips and slight basal webbing. The hind limbs are moderately long; the toes have rounded tips and poorly developed webbing. The dorsal ground color varies from light orange brown to dark chocolate brown. There are obscure dark markings. The venter is dirty cream, dusted with brown on the throat. Males have a single subgular vocal sac.

The male advertisement call is an intermittently emitted, soft "ting".

== Habitat and conservation ==
The type series was collected from a mossy cloud forest at elevations of 1,954–1,991 m (6,411–6,532 ft) above sea level. Adults are camouflaged and burrow into mosses, making them difficult to find. The diet includes spiders, grasshoppers, and weevils. Eggs and tadpoles have been found in a large cup of the pitcher plant Nepenthes macfarlanei, and tadpoles in a water-filled tree stump.

Suitable mossy forests are only found on the top of the mountain and the species is likely to be a micro-endemic, not to be found more widely. The habitat is threatened by tourist activities (hiking, expanding tourist facilities). Moreover, there is illegal collection of slipper orchids that could disturb the habitat. The population occurs within the Gunung Brinchang Forest Reserve.
