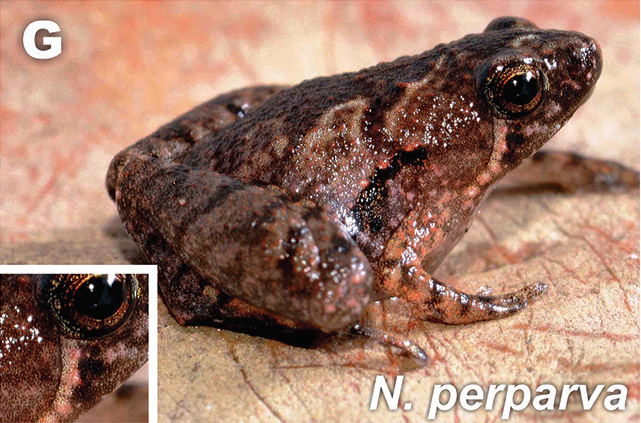
- Nanohyla perparva from Gunung Mulu, Sarawak, Malaysia

Conservation status
- Least Concern (IUCN 3.1)

Scientific classification
- Kingdom: Animalia
- Phylum: Chordata
- Class: Amphibia
- Order: Anura
- Family: Microhylidae
- Genus: Nanohyla
- Species: N. perparva

Binomial name
- Nanohyla perparva (Inger and Frogner, 1979)

Synonyms
- Microhyla perparva Inger and Frogner, 1979

= Nanohyla perparva =

Species of amphibian

Nanohyla perparva is a diminutive species of frog in the family Microhylidae. It is endemic to Borneo and found in Kalimantan (Indonesia), Brunei, and Sabah and Sarawak (Malaysia). The nominal species includes distinct lineages that likely represent different species. Common names least narrow-mouthed frog and Labang forest rice frog have been proposed for this species.

== Taxonomy ==
N. perparva was formerly placed in the genus Microhyla, but a 2021 study using morphological and phylogenetic evidence moved nine species (including N. perparva) to a new genus, Nanohyla.

== Description ==
Adult males measure 10.5–11.9 mm (0.4–0.5 in) and adult females 12.4–14.5 mm (0.5–0.6 in) in snout–vent length. The hands have only three fingers. The toe tips are expanded. Colouration consists of shades of brown above, with dark markings on the shoulders and a light band on the flanks.

The tadpoles are very delicate and mostly transparent but appear dark grey when viewed from above. The tail terminates in a flagellum.

== Habitat and conservation ==
Nanohyla perparva occurs in primary lowland rainforests at elevations below 250 m (820 ft). Adults live in the leaf litter and reproduce in both large and small rainwater pools. It can be very abundant after heavy rains when males congregate in water filled depressions and fight for females. The tadpoles are mid-water suspension feeders.

This species is threatened by clear-cutting and conversion of forests into oil palm plantations. It is present in a number of protected areas.
