= Kalophrynus subterrestris =

Conservation status
- Least Concern (IUCN 3.1)

Scientific classification
- Kingdom: Animalia
- Phylum: Chordata
- Class: Amphibia
- Order: Anura
- Family: Microhylidae
- Genus: Kalophrynus
- Species: K. subterrestris

Binomial name
- Kalophrynus subterrestris Inger, 1966

Species of frog

Kalophrynus subterrestris is a species of frog in the family Microhylidae. It endemic to Borneo where it is known from Sabah and Sarawak (Malaysia), although it is also presumed to be present in Kalimantan (Indonesia) and Brunei. Common names burrowing grainy frog and Labang sticky frog have been coined for this species.

== Description ==
Males measure 21–23 mm (0.83–0.91 in) and females 26–27 mm (1.0–1.1 in) in snout–vent length. The tympanum is distinct. The finger and toe tips are rounded. The toes have basal webbing. Skin is coarsely granular. The dorsum is dark gray, without darker or lighter markings. The sides of body are orange in the groin. The venter has dusky mottling anteriorly; the belly is white.

== Habitat and conservation ==
Natural habitats of Kalophrynus subterrestris are lowland, tropical moist forests below 300 m (980 ft) above sea level. They typically occur under leaf litter or in burrows (hence the specific name subterrestris). The species is relatively abundant locally, but it does not occur in modified habitats; habitat loss from clear-cutting is a threat.
