= Feihyla fuhua =

Conservation status
- Least Concern (IUCN 3.1)

Scientific classification
- Kingdom: Animalia
- Phylum: Chordata
- Class: Amphibia
- Order: Anura
- Family: Rhacophoridae
- Genus: Feihyla
- Species: F. fuhua

Binomial name
- Feihyla fuhua Fei, Ye, and Jiang, 2010

Species of frog

Feihyla fuhua, the white-cheeked jelly-nest frog or white-cheeked small tree frog, is a species of frog in the family Rhacophoridae. It is endemic to China, where it has been observed in the Yunnan Province, parts of the Guangxi Province, and the Guizhou Province. It is suspected to be present in nearby parts of Vietnam.

This frog has been in forests near streams between 1,000 and 1,900 meters above sea level. The female frog lays eggs in piles of jelly on leaves. The tadpoles swim in static water.

The IUCN classifies this frog as least concern of extinction because of its large range and relative abundance. Outside protected parks, humans can pose some threat to this frog by collecting wood. The frog's range includes several protected parks, including Hualinshan Nature Reserves.

== Original publication ==
- Fei L; C-y Ye; J-p Jiang (2010). "A new species of Rhacophoridae from Yunnan, China (Amphibia, Anura)". Acta Zootaxonomica Sinica. 35 (2): 413–417.
