= Kalophrynus robinsoni =

Conservation status
- Data Deficient (IUCN 3.1)

Scientific classification
- Kingdom: Animalia
- Phylum: Chordata
- Class: Amphibia
- Order: Anura
- Family: Microhylidae
- Genus: Kalophrynus
- Species: K. robinsoni

Binomial name
- Kalophrynus robinsoni Smith, 1922

Species of frog

Kalophrynus robinsoni (common names: Robinson's grainy frog, Pahang Mountain sticky frog) is a species of frog in the family Microhylidae. It is endemic to Pahang in central Peninsular Malaysia. The specific name robinsoni honours Herbert C. Robinson, a British zoologist and ornithologist. This poorly known species has not been reported since 1922.

== Description ==
Males measure 17–18 mm (0.67–0.71 in) and female(s) 18 mm (0.71 in) in snout–vent length; it is uncertain whether these are juveniles or adults. The snout is short and truncate. The tympanum is visible and about two-thirds of the eye diameter. The toes are one-third webbed and have bluntly pointed tips. The dorsum is light brown and has an elongated X-shaped mark, extending from the eyelids to the groin. The venter is yellowish with brown spots and speckles.

== Habitat and conservation ==
Its natural habitat is, presumably, primary rainforest. The type locality is within the Taman Negara National Park.
