= Nanohyla annamensis =

Conservation status
- Vulnerable (IUCN 3.1)

Scientific classification
- Kingdom: Animalia
- Phylum: Chordata
- Class: Amphibia
- Order: Anura
- Family: Microhylidae
- Genus: Nanohyla
- Species: N. annamensis

Binomial name
- Nanohyla annamensis (Smith, 1923)
- N. annamensis is found in parts of Cambodia, Laos, Thailand and Vietnam.

Synonyms
- Microhyla annamensis Smith, 1923

Species of amphibian

Nanohyla annamensis, commonly known as the Annam chorus frog, Annam narrow-mouthed frog, Vietnam rice frog or minute narrow-mouthed frog, is a species of frog in the family Microhylidae. It is found in Cambodia, Laos, Thailand, and Vietnam. Its natural habitats are subtropical or tropical moist lowland forests, subtropical or tropical moist montane forests, swamps, and intermittent freshwater marshes. It is listed as vulnerable by the IUCN Red List due to habitat loss and degradation.

== Taxonomy ==
Nanohyla annamensis was formerly placed in the genus Microhyla, but a 2021 study using morphological and phylogenetic evidence moved nine species (including N. annamensis) to a new genus, Nanohyla.
