= Samkos bush frog =

Conservation status
- Vulnerable (IUCN 3.1)

Scientific classification
- Kingdom: Animalia
- Phylum: Chordata
- Class: Amphibia
- Order: Anura
- Family: Rhacophoridae
- Genus: Feihyla
- Species: F. samkosensis

Binomial name
- Feihyla samkosensis (Grismer, Neang, Chav & Holden, 2007)

Synonyms
- Chiromantis samkosensis Grismer et al., 2007; Chirixalus samkosensis (Chen et al., 2020)

Species of amphibian

The Samkos bush frog (Feihyla samkosensis) is a moss frog found in Cambodia in the Cardamom Mountains. It was first described in 2007.

== Description ==
The Samkos bush frog is relatively small, around 25 mm (0.98 in) in snout-to-vent length. It has a smooth body and translucent skin; its blood is externally visible. It has green-colored blood and turquoise-hued bones, a result of a pigment in waste products, biliverdin.

== Distribution ==
The species is found in the jungle terrain of the Cardamom Mountains in southwestern Cambodia. It was found in Pursat Province in the Phnom Samkos area at 500 metres (1,600 ft) above sea level.

== Conservation status ==
F. samkosensis is listed as "vulnerable" by the IUCN. Human expansion threatens the species, notably via a new, wide, graded road through the middle of the type locality.

== See also ==
- Prasinohaema
