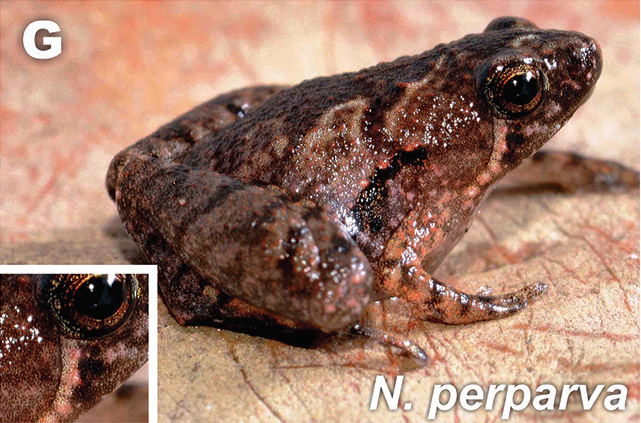
- Nanohyla perparva

Scientific classification
- Kingdom: Animalia
- Phylum: Chordata
- Class: Amphibia
- Order: Anura
- Family: Microhylidae
- Subfamily: Microhylinae
- Genus: Nanohyla; Poyarkov, Gorin & Scherz, 2021

Type species
- Microhyla annectens Boulenger, 1900

Species
- 10, see text.

Synonyms
- Microhyla (in part) Tschudi, 1838

= Nanohyla =

Genus of amphibians

Nanohyla is a genus of frogs in the family Microhylidae. Members of the genus are known as pygmy narrow-mouthed frogs. The members of the genus are found throughout Southeast Asia in the countries of Vietnam, Laos, Cambodia, Thailand, Malaysia, Brunei, Indonesia and the Philippines.

== Taxonomy ==
All the members of Nanohyla were formerly placed in Microhyla; however, a 2021 study used morphological and phylogenetic evidence to show that Nanohyla forms a separate lineage from Microhyla and Glyphoglossus.

== Species ==
There are currently ten species placed in Nanohyla:

- Nanohyla albopunctanta (Gorin, V. A., A. V. Trofimets, S. I. Gogoleva, C. X. Le, and N. A. Poyarkov, Jr., 2023)
- Nanohyla annamensis (Smith, 1923) (Annam chorus frog)
- Nanohyla annectens (Boulenger, 1900) (Larut Hills rice frog)
- Nanohyla arboricola (Poyarkov, Vassilieva, Orlov, Galoyan, Tran, Le, Kretova & Geissler, 2014)
- Nanohyla hongiaoensis (Hoang, Nguyen, Luong, Nguyen, Orlov, Chen, Wang & Jiang, 2020)
- Nanohyla marmorata (Bain & Nguyen, 2004)
- Nanohyla nanapollexa (Bain & Nguyen, 2004)
- Nanohyla perparva (Inger & Frogner, 1979)
- Nanohyla petrigena (Inger & Frogner, 1979)
- Nanohyla pulchella (Poyarkov, Vassilieva, Orlov, Galoyan, Tran, Le, Kretova & Geissler, 2014)
