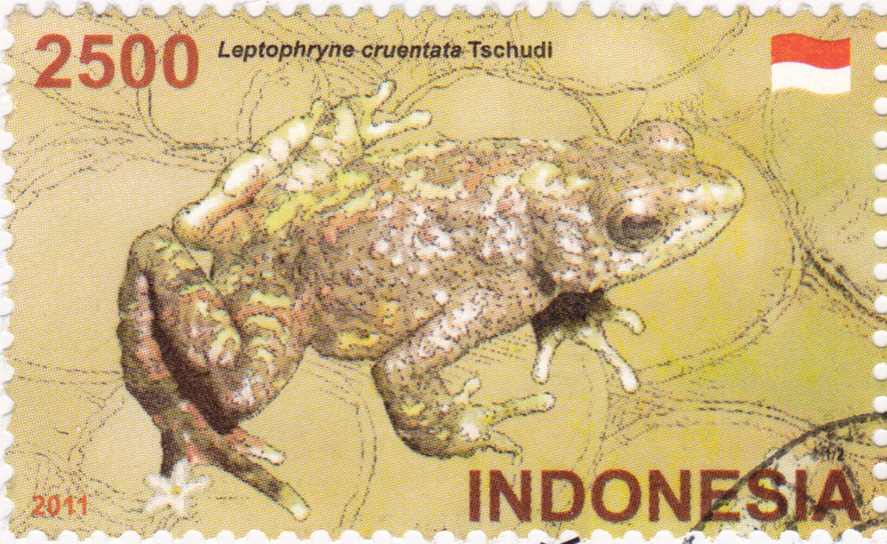
- Leptophryne cruentata in an Indonesian stamp

Scientific classification
- Kingdom: Animalia
- Phylum: Chordata
- Class: Amphibia
- Order: Anura
- Family: Bufonidae
- Genus: Leptophryne; Fitzinger, 1843

Type species
- Bufo cruentatus Tschudi, 1838

Species
- 2–3 species (see text)

Synonyms
- Cacophryne Davis, 1935

= Leptophryne =

Genus of amphibians

Leptophryne is a small genus of true toads, family Bufonidae, with only three species. The genus is found in Southeast Asia, in the Malay Peninsula (including Peninsular Thailand) and the Greater Sunda Islands. Its relationships within Bufonidae are uncertain; its closest relative might be Epidalea.

== Species ==
Three species are recognized in this genus:

Binomial Name and Author	Common Name
Leptophryne borbonica (Tschudi, 1838)	Java tree toad; Bourbon toad
Leptophryne cruentata (Tschudi, 1838)	Indonesia tree toad
Leptophryne javanica Hamidy, Munir, Mumpuni, Rahmania, and Kholik, 2018	Sumatran tree toad
