= Kalophrynus nubicola =

Conservation status
- Least Concern (IUCN 3.1)

Scientific classification
- Kingdom: Animalia
- Phylum: Chordata
- Class: Amphibia
- Order: Anura
- Family: Microhylidae
- Genus: Kalophrynus
- Species: K. nubicola

Binomial name
- Kalophrynus nubicola Dring, 1983

Species of frog

Kalophrynus nubicola is a species of frog in the family Microhylidae. It is endemic to Sarawak in Malaysian Borneo and is only known from the Gunung Mulu National Park. The specific name nubicola means "dwelling in cloud". Common names blue-spotted sticky frog and mossy-forest sticky frog has been coined for this species.

== Description ==
Males measure 14–24 mm (0.6–0.9 in) and adult females 21–24 mm (0.8–0.9 in) in snout–vent length. The overall appearance is stout. The snout is short, rounded in dorsal view and truncate in profile. The tympanum is indistinct. The finger and the toe tips are slightly flattened and obtusely rounded; the toes have some webbing. Skin is smooth to shagreened above and weakly granular below. The dorsal coloration is brown with faint dark mottling. There is a dark-brown-edged yellow chevron on the snout and upper eyelids. The throat and chest are orange, heavily mottled with dark brown. Posteriorly, the belly has a pattern that varies from many small pale spots in a thin brown network, to a few large pale patches. Males have a median subgular vocal sac.

== Habitat and conservation ==
Kalophrynus nubicola occurs in montane forests at elevations above 1,500 m (4,900 ft). It is a terrestrial frog. Breeding presumably takes place in small, temporary forest pools. The known range is within the Gunung Mulu National Park, which is well protected; this species is not considered threatened, despite its relatively small range.
