= Kalophrynus intermedius =

Conservation status
- Least Concern (IUCN 3.1)

Scientific classification
- Kingdom: Animalia
- Phylum: Chordata
- Class: Amphibia
- Order: Anura
- Family: Microhylidae
- Genus: Kalophrynus
- Species: K. intermedius

Binomial name
- Kalophrynus intermedius Inger, 1966

Species of frog

Kalophrynus intermedius is a species of frog in the family Microhylidae. It is endemic to Borneo and is found in Brunei, south-central Sarawak (Malaysia), and Kalimantan (Indonesia). Common names intermediate sticky frog, Sarawak grainy frog, and Mengiong sticky frog have been proposed for it.

== Description ==
Adult females measure 38–41 mm (1.5–1.6 in) in snout–vent length; males reach smaller sizes than females. The overall appearance is stocky with short limbs. The snout is obtuse. The tympanum is distinct. Fingers have no webbing whereas the toes are about two-thirds webbed. The dorsum is dark brown and the flanks are lighter in color. The face and chest are orange, with this coloration sometimes extending to the flanks. The throat has two longitudinal bands. An elongate gland is located above and behind the ear, dissolving into a series of warts that separate the dorsum from the flanks. The finger and toe tips are orange.

When disturbed, these frogs secrete a sticky, white substance from their skin.

== Habitat and conservation ==
Kalophrynus intermedius lives in leaf-litter on the floor of closed-canopy forests at elevations of 150–300 m (490–980 ft) above sea level. Breeding probably takes place in small rain pools.

It is a widespread but rarely encountered species. It does not tolerate habitat disturbance and is therefore threatened by clear-cutting of lowland tropical rainforests for logging and palm oil plantations. It is, however, present in several protected areas.
