= Kalophrynus heterochirus =

Conservation status
- Least Concern (IUCN 3.1)

Scientific classification
- Kingdom: Animalia
- Phylum: Chordata
- Class: Amphibia
- Order: Anura
- Family: Microhylidae
- Genus: Kalophrynus
- Species: K. heterochirus

Binomial name
- Kalophrynus heterochirus Boulenger, 1900

Species of frog

Kalophrynus heterochirus is a species of frog in the family Microhylidae. It is found in Indonesia and Malaysia. Its natural habitats are subtropical or tropical moist lowland forests, subtropical or tropical moist montane forests, intermittent freshwater marshes, and heavily degraded former forest. It is threatened by habitat loss.
