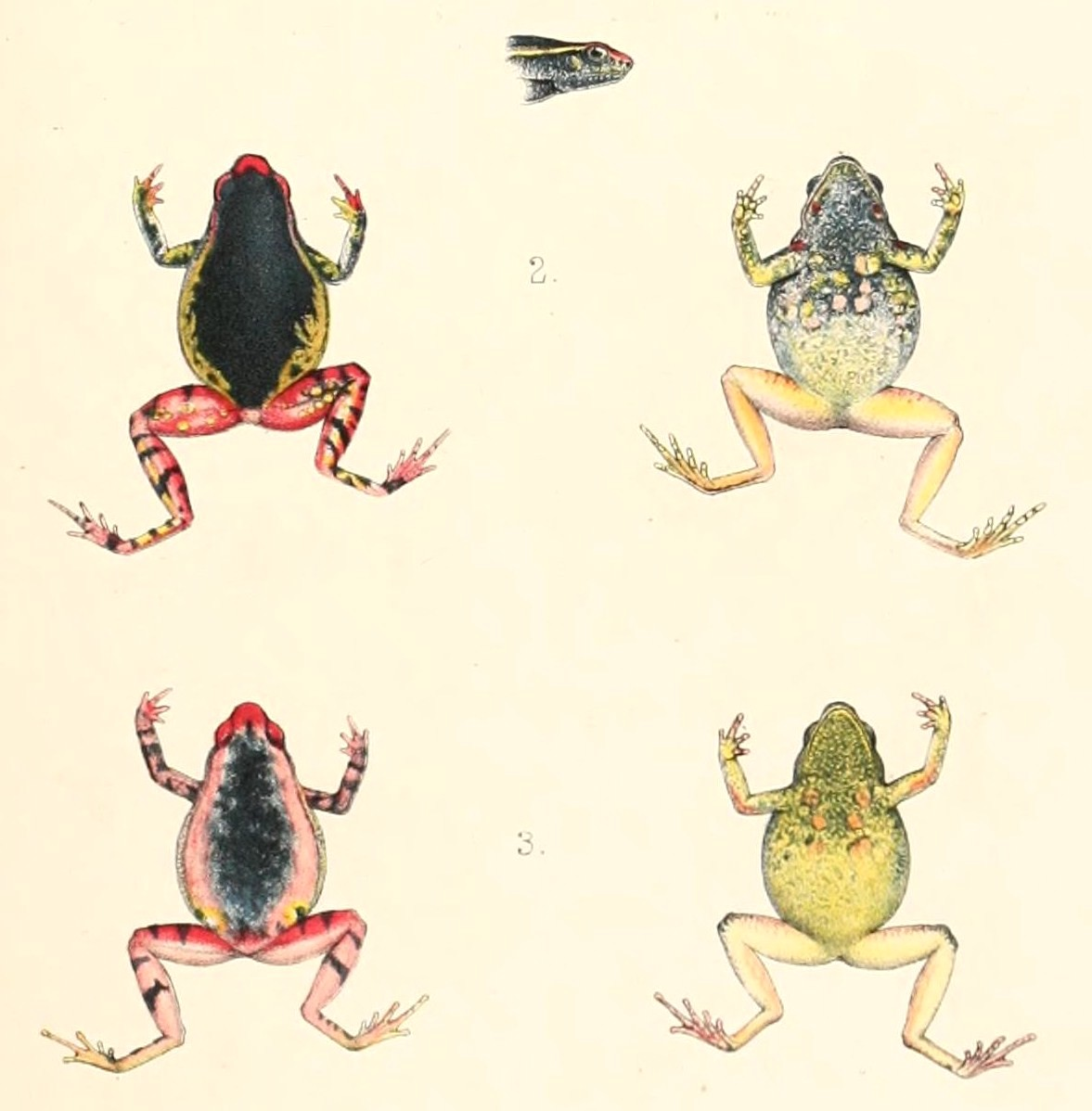

Conservation status
- Data Deficient (IUCN 3.1)

Scientific classification
- Kingdom: Animalia
- Phylum: Chordata
- Class: Amphibia
- Order: Anura
- Family: Microhylidae
- Genus: Kalophrynus
- Species: K. bunguranus

Binomial name
- Kalophrynus bunguranus (Günther, 1895)

= Kalophrynus bunguranus =

Species of frog

Kalophrynus bunguranus is a species of frog in the family Microhylidae. It is endemic to Indonesia. Its natural habitats are subtropical or tropical moist lowland forests and intermittent freshwater marshes.
