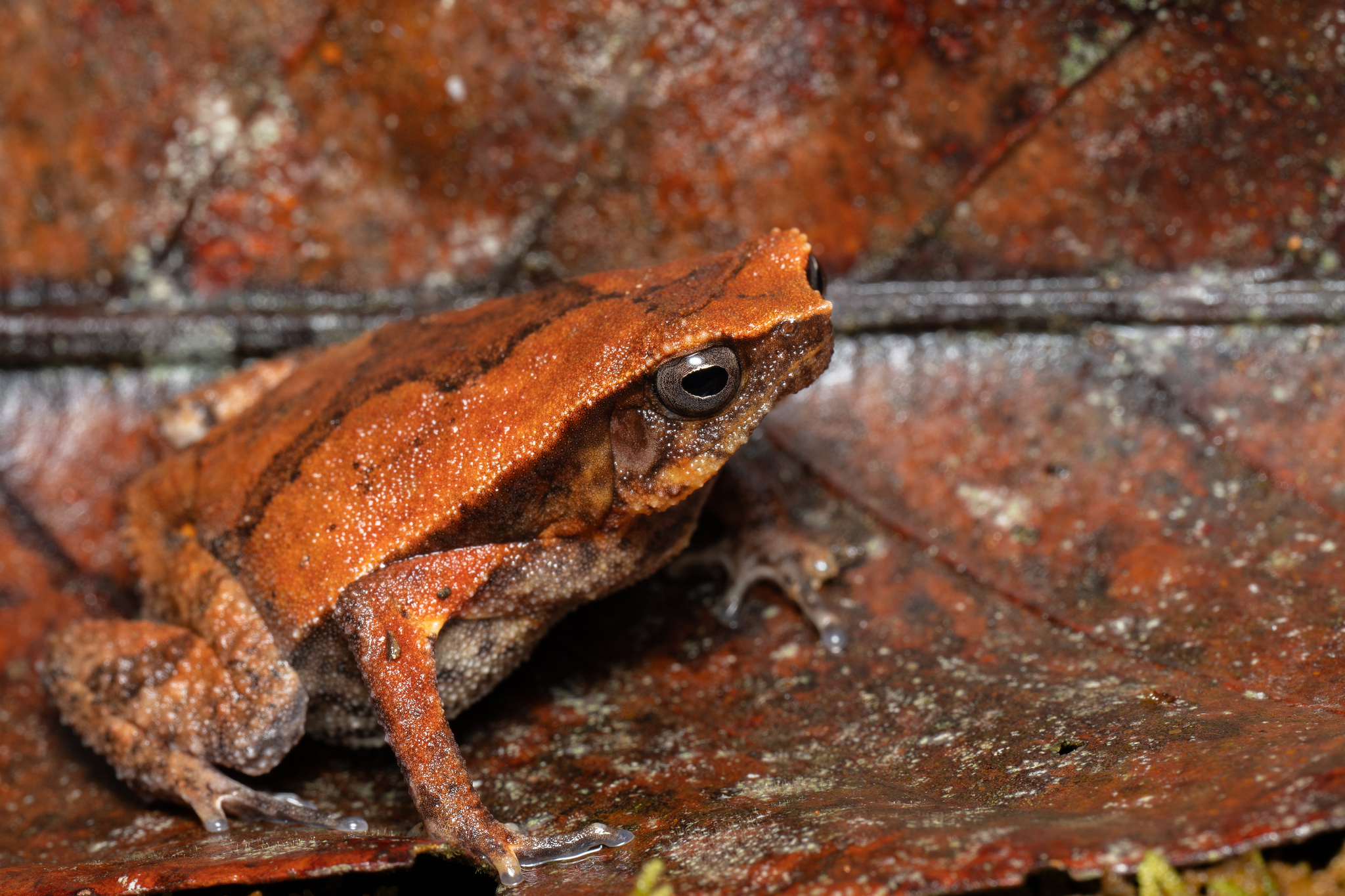

Conservation status
- Least Concern (IUCN 3.1)

Scientific classification
- Kingdom: Animalia
- Phylum: Chordata
- Class: Amphibia
- Order: Anura
- Family: Microhylidae
- Genus: Kalophrynus
- Species: K. baluensis

Binomial name
- Kalophrynus baluensis Kiew, 1984

= Kalophrynus baluensis =

Species of frog

Kalophrynus baluensis (common names: Malaysian grainy frog, Balu sticky frog, Kinabalu sticky frog) is a species of frog in the family Microhylidae. It is endemic to Mount Kinabalu in Sabah (East Malaysia, Borneo).

Kalophrynus baluensis is unusual in that it appears to have diverged from its closest known relative that is not endemic to Mount Kinabalu before the mountain reached its present elevation. Most other Mount Kinabalu endemics are younger than the mountain (approximately 6 million years), and thus appear to have evolved there relatively recently.

== Description ==
Kalophrynus baluensis is a stocky, short-legged frog. Females grow to 39 mm (1.5 in) in snout–vent length; males stay slightly smaller. Its brown colouration makes its perfectly camouflaged in its habitat, the leaf litter layer on the forest floor.

== Habitat and conservation ==
Natural habitats of Kalophrynus baluensis are montane oak-chestnut forests at elevations of 1,300–1,800 m (4,300–5,900 ft) asl. They are usually encountered on the forest floor. Male advertisement calls have been heard some distance away from water, suggesting that it might breed in phytotelmata.

There are no major threats to the species, and it is known to occur in the Kinabalu National Park. Nevertheless, its total area of distribution is relatively small.
