= Kalophrynus eok =

Conservation status
- Data Deficient (IUCN 3.1)

Scientific classification
- Kingdom: Animalia
- Phylum: Chordata
- Class: Amphibia
- Order: Anura
- Family: Microhylidae
- Genus: Kalophrynus
- Species: K. eok

Binomial name
- Kalophrynus eok Das and Haas, 2003
- Kalophrynus eok is only known from the Kelabit Highlands in Malaysian Borneo

Species of frog

Kalophrynus eok is a species of frog in the family Microhylidae. It is endemic to Borneo and currently only known from its type locality in the Kelabit Highlands of Sarawak, Malaysia, but presumably, it also occurs in the adjacent Kalimantan, Indonesia. The specific name eok is Kelabit for "tiny" and refers to the small size of this species. Common names eok sticky frog and small Bario sticky frog have been coined for it.

== Description ==
Kalophrynus eok is only known from the holotype, an adult male measuring 26 mm (1.0 in) in snout–vent length. The snout is obtuse and slightly projects beyond the mandible. The head is broader than it is long. The tympanum is distinct; no supratympanic fold is present. The fingers and the toes have rounded tips and basal webbing. The dorsum is granular, particularly on the eyelids and upper surfaces of the limbs. The dorsal coloration is brick-red. There is a sepia interorbital band that is connected to an irregular, inverted V-shaped scapular mark of the same color, which in turn is followed by an irregular transverse band across the midbody. The venter is flesh color and sides of the throat are peach red.

== Habitat and conservation ==
The holotype was found in primary submontane forest at an elevation of about 1,050 m (3,440 ft) above sea level. The specimen was calling from a water-filled node of a bamboo plant fallen across a forest path. Breeding might take place in water pools at the internodes of such bamboo plants.

The Kelabit Highlands in their entirety are threatened by commercial logging. Furthermore, the type of bamboo this species was found in are utilized locally.
