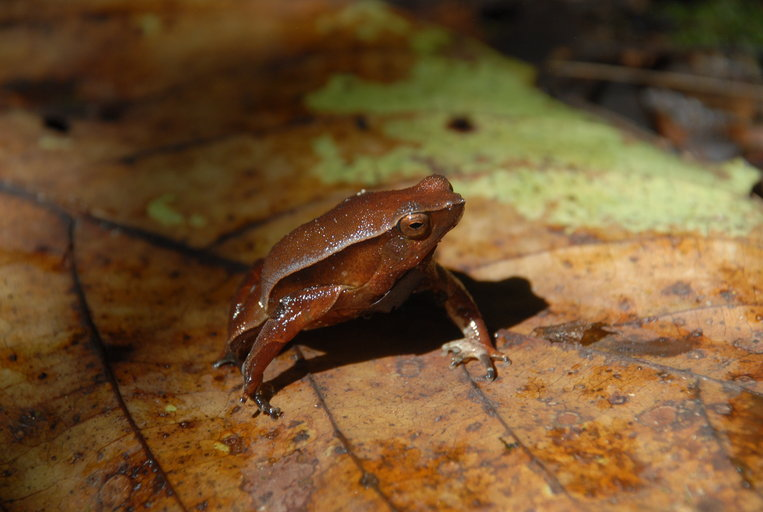

Conservation status
- Least Concern (IUCN 3.1)

Scientific classification
- Kingdom: Animalia
- Phylum: Chordata
- Class: Amphibia
- Order: Anura
- Family: Microhylidae
- Genus: Kalophrynus
- Species: K. pleurostigma

Binomial name
- Kalophrynus pleurostigma Tschudi, 1838

Synonyms
- Kalophrynus stellatus

= Black-spotted sticky frog =

Species of amphibian

The black-spotted sticky frog (Kalophrynus pleurostigma) is a small frog with a black spot just in front of each of its hind legs. It releases a sticky substance when threatened, thereby making it an unpleasant meal for predators, allowing it to escape from harm.

This species develops in the pitchers of some carnivorous Nepenthes, a habitat that is fast diminishing locally. On a global scale, it is not yet considered threatened by the IUCN.
