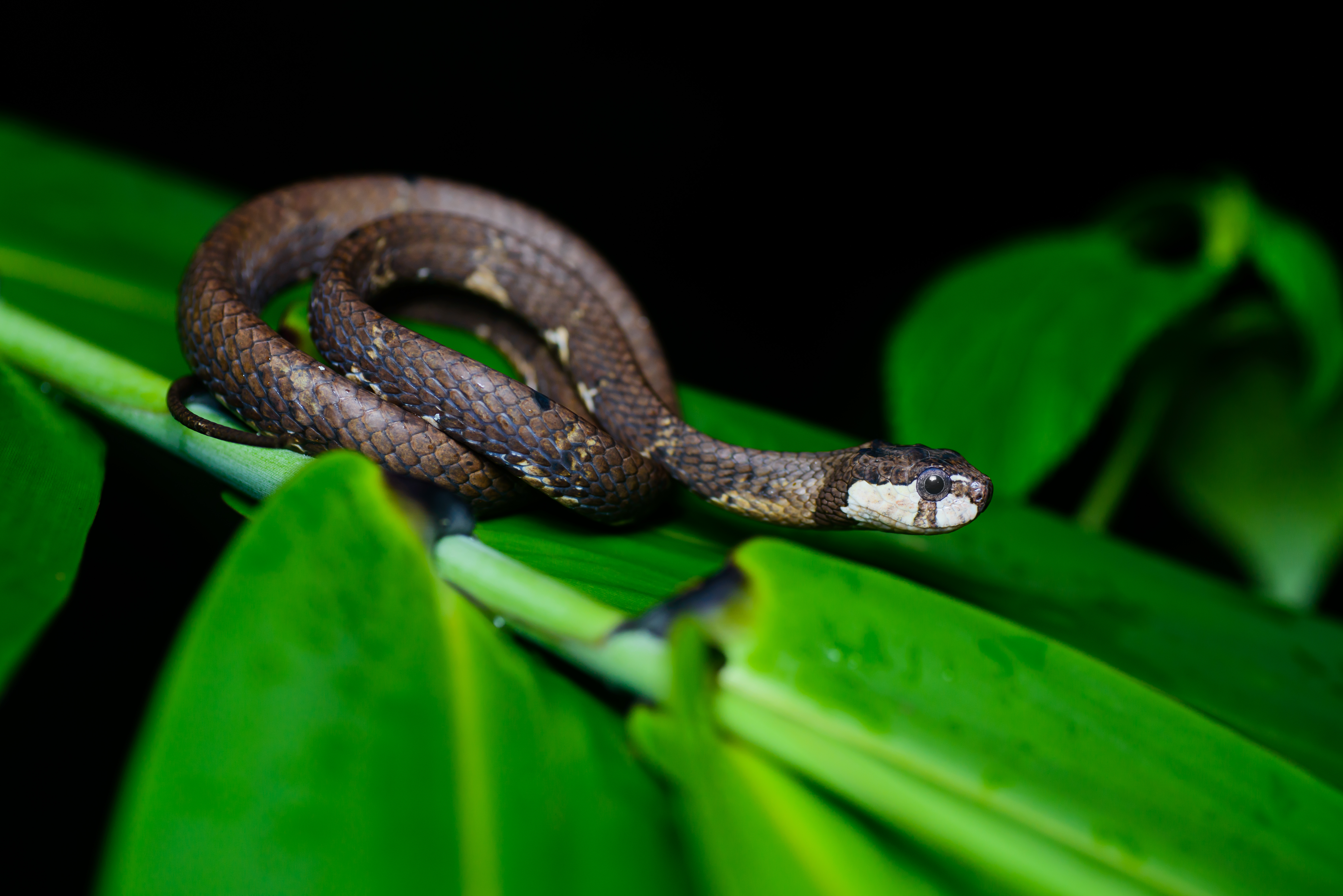
- Aplopeltura boa, Khao Luang National Park.

Conservation status
- Least Concern (IUCN 3.1)

Scientific classification
- Kingdom: Animalia
- Phylum: Chordata
- Order: Squamata
- Suborder: Serpentes
- Family: Pareidae
- Genus: Aplopeltura; Duméril, 1853
- Species: A. boa

Binomial name
- Aplopeltura boa Boie, 1828

= Aplopeltura =

Genus of snakes

Aplopeltura is a genus of snakes of the family Pareidae. It contains a single species, Aplopeltura boa, the blunthead slug snake or blunt-headed slug-eating snake. It is a small, non-venomous snake. The species can be found in southern Thailand, Malaysia, Indonesia, Brunei and the Philippines.

A. boa eats mainly snails, especially operculate species. Their jaws are more mobile than those of most other vertebrates. With their mandibles, they cut the operculum off from their prey with a unique "sawing" motion.

A. boa has been observed performing simple death feigning behavior. The snake rolls itself into a spiral with its belly up, staying still until the threat leaves. Unlike other death feigning snakes, A. boa does not emit a foul odor or open its mouth.

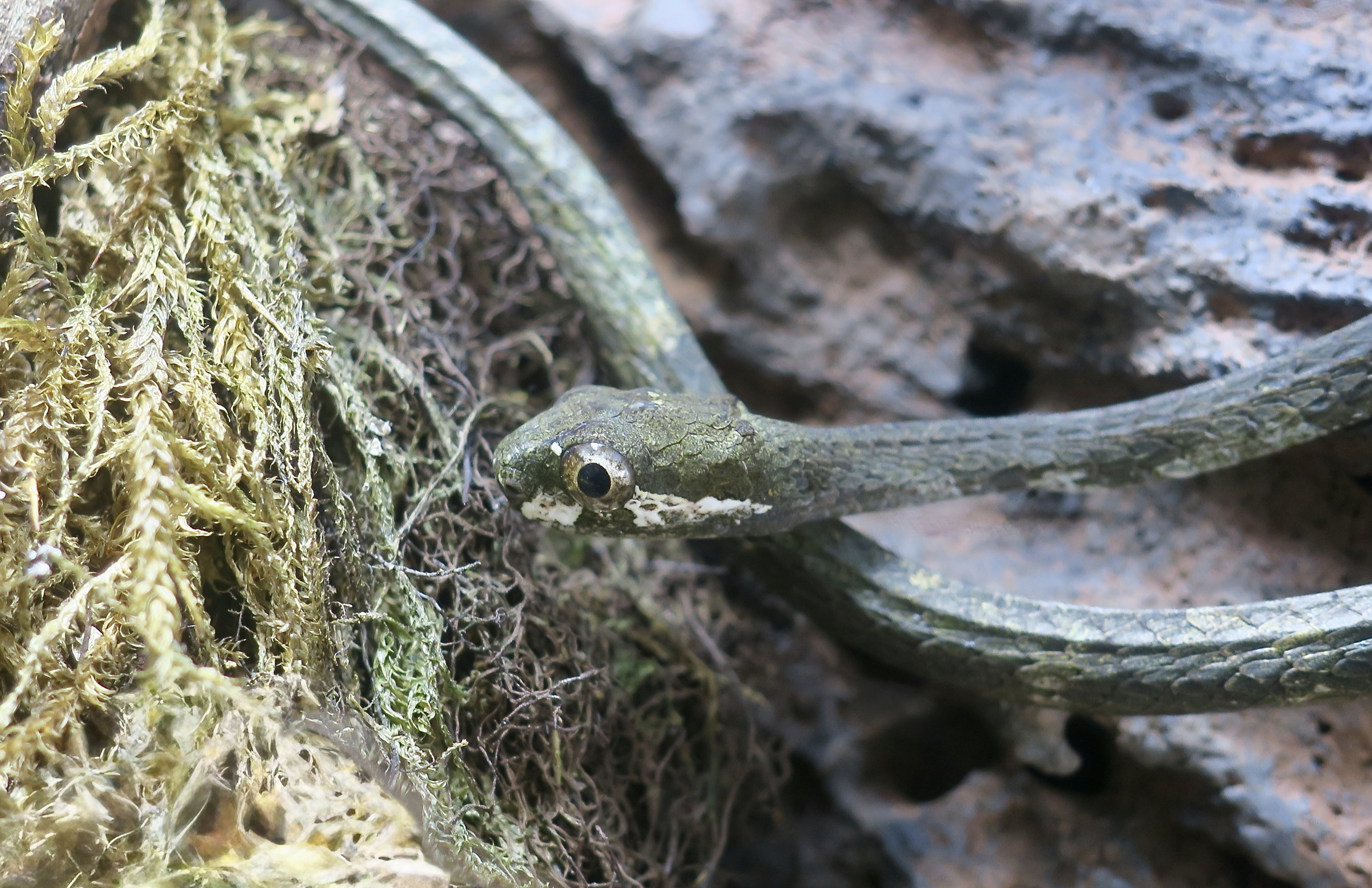
At 9th Island Reptiles, a store in Las Vegas.

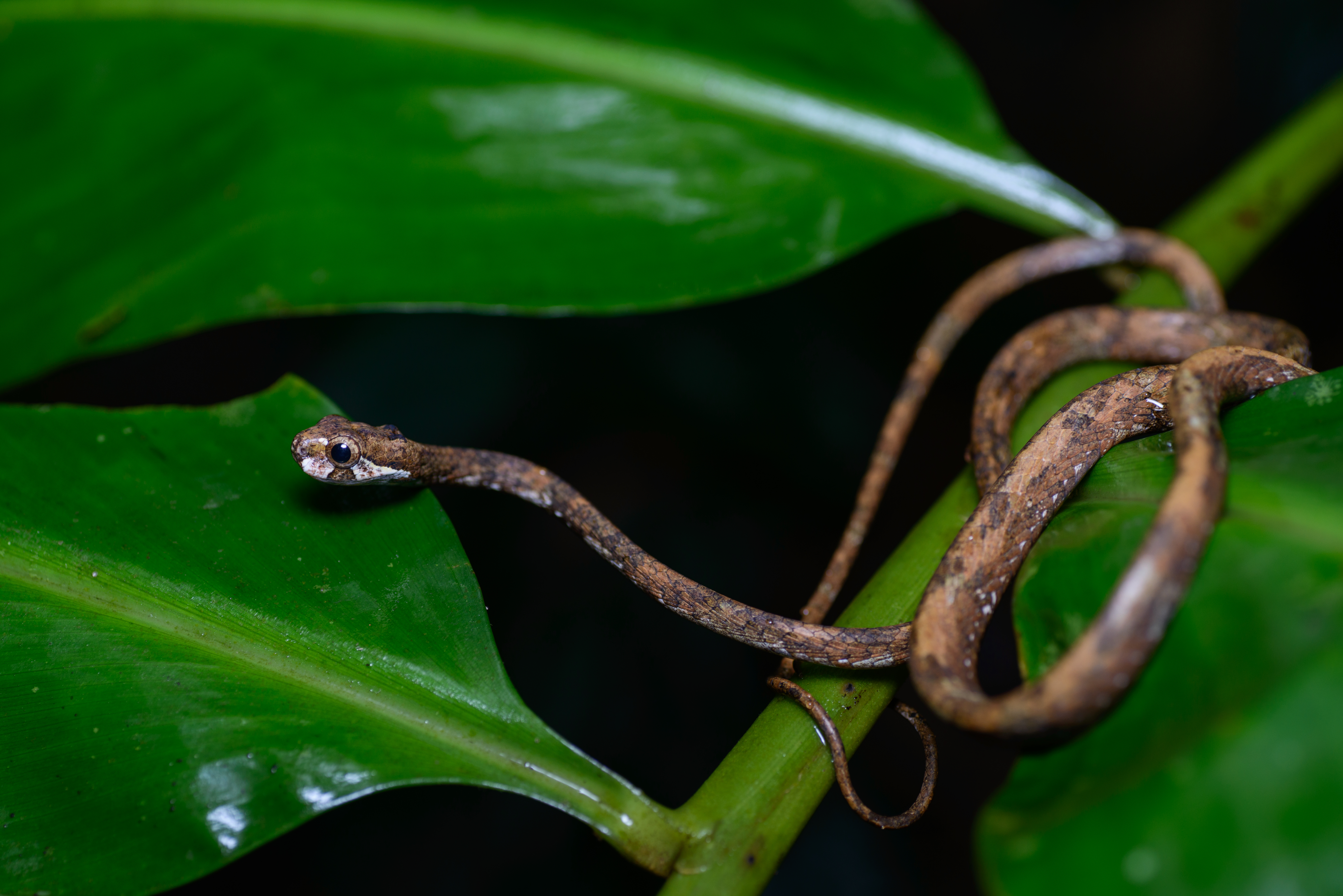
Aplopeltura boa, Khao Sok National Park.
