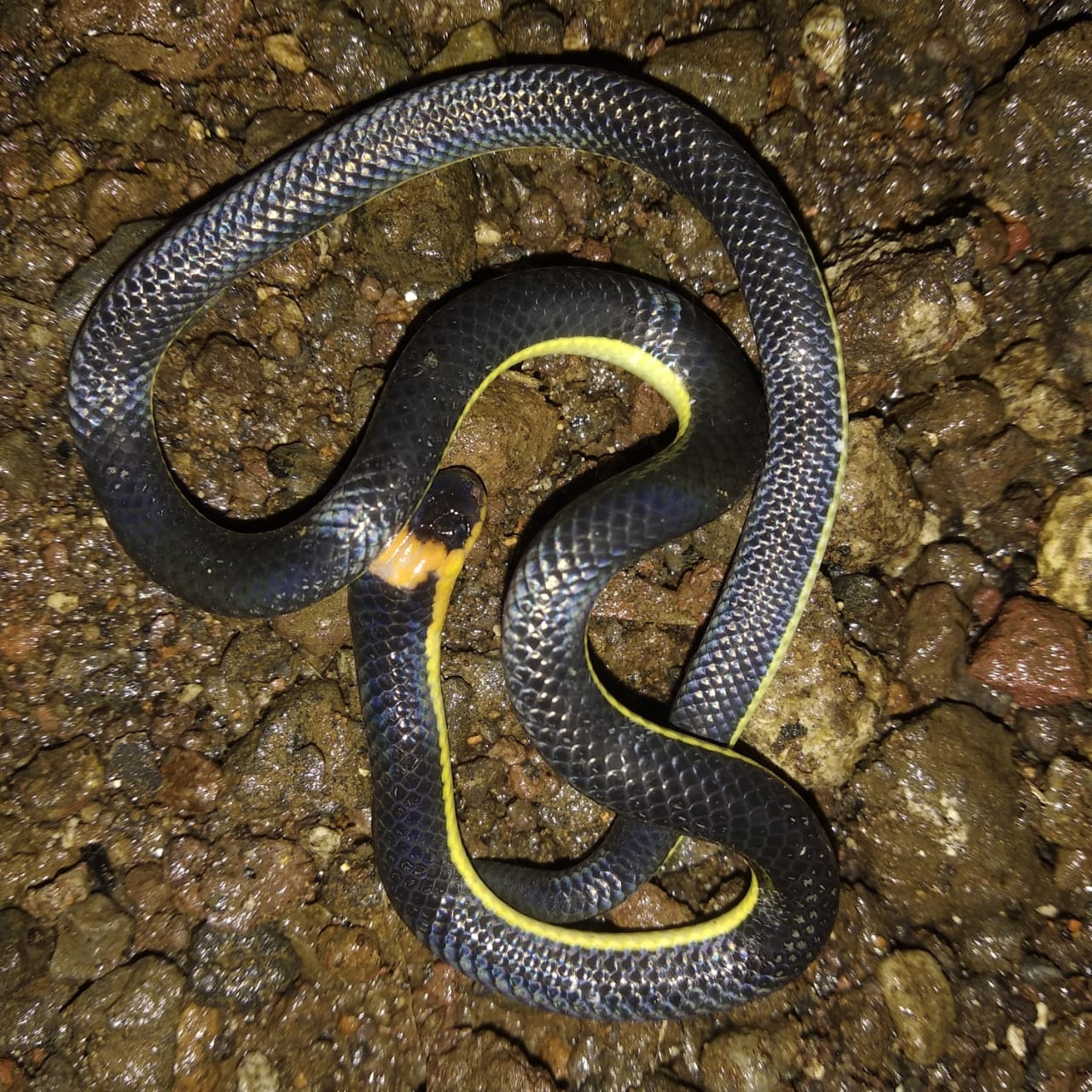

Conservation status
- Least Concern (IUCN 3.1)

Scientific classification
- Kingdom: Animalia
- Phylum: Chordata
- Class: Reptilia
- Order: Squamata
- Suborder: Serpentes
- Family: Colubridae
- Genus: Calamaria
- Species: C. lumbricoidea

Binomial name
- Calamaria lumbricoidea Boie, 1827
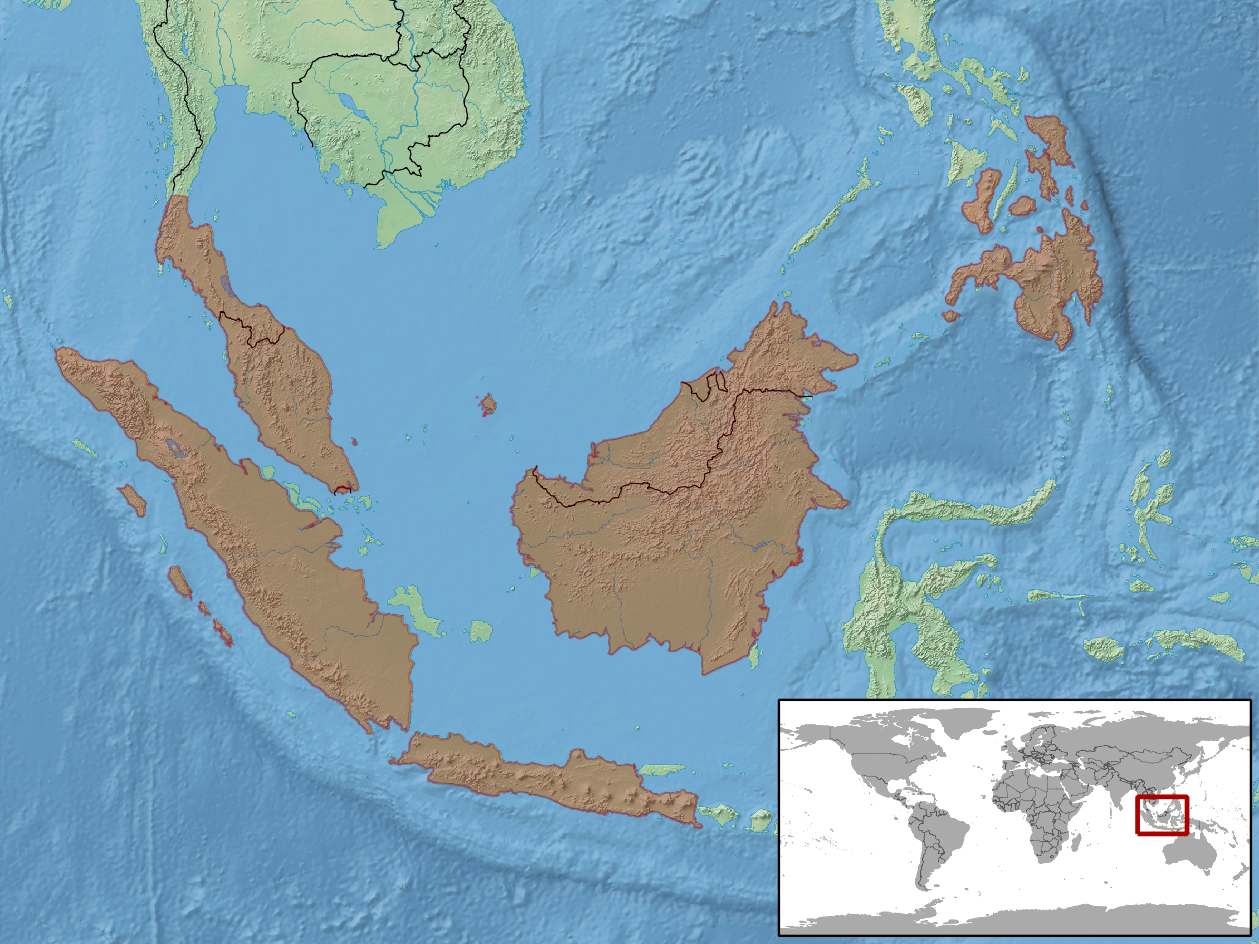

Synonyms
- Calamaria vermiformis A.M.C. Duméril, Bibron & DUMÉRIL 1854; Calamaria temmincki A.M.C. Duméril, Bibron & DUMÉRIL 1854; Calamaria lumbricoidea A.M.C. Duméril& Bibron 1854; Calamaria melanorhynchos Bleeker 1860; Calamaria alkeni Bleeker 1860; Calamaria lumbricoidea Jan 1865; Calamaria vermiformis Jan 1865; Calamaria stahlknechtii STOLICZKA 1873; Calamaria stahlknechtii Boulenger 1885; Calamaria vermiformis var. sumatranus Lidth De Jeude 1890; Calamaria bungaroides Werner 1901; Calamaria bruegeli Mertens 1924 (fide Manthey 1983); Calamaria vermiformis Tweedie 1950; Calamaria vermiformis Tweedie 1954; Calamaria lumbricoidea Inger & Marx 1965; Calamaria vermiformis Hendrickson 1966; Calamaria lumbricoidea Grandison 1972; Calamaria lumbricoidea Manthey & Grossmann 1997; Calamaria lumbricoidea Cox et al. 1998; Calamaria lumbricoidea Inger & Voris 2001

= Calamaria lumbricoidea =

Variable Reed Snake

Species of snake

Calamaria lumbricoidea, commonly known as variable reed snake, is a species of dwarf snake in the family Colubridae . It is found in Thailand, W. Malaysia, Singapore, Indonesia and Philippines.
