= Micryletta menglienica =

Conservation status
- Data Deficient (IUCN 3.1)

Scientific classification
- Kingdom: Animalia
- Phylum: Chordata
- Class: Amphibia
- Order: Anura
- Family: Microhylidae
- Genus: Micryletta
- Species: M. menglienica

Binomial name
- Micryletta menglienica (Yang and Su, 1980)

Synonyms
- Kalophrynus menglienicus Yang and Su, 1980

Species of frog

Micryletta menglienica is a species of frog in the family Microhylidae. It is known from the vicinity of its type locality in Menglian County in southern Yunnan, China, and from northern Vietnam; it is likely to occur in adjacent Myanmar and northern Laos. Common names Menglien grainy frog, Menglien narrow-mouthed frog, and Menglien dwarf sticky frog have been coined for this species, in reference to the type locality, as is the specific name menglienica.

== Description ==
Males measure 20–23 mm (0.79–0.91 in) in snout–vent length (female length is unknown). The body is comparatively slim. The tympanum is visible. Fingers and toes are not webbed. Males have a single vocal sac.

Micryletta menglienica have been observed to feed on insects, in particular ants.

== Habitat and conservation ==
Micryletta menglienica inhabits fields near forest and small ponds. Breeding takes place in ponds and flooded paddy fields. Pollution might threaten this species.
