= Kalophrynus minusculus =

Conservation status
- Least Concern (IUCN 3.1)

Scientific classification
- Kingdom: Animalia
- Phylum: Chordata
- Class: Amphibia
- Order: Anura
- Family: Microhylidae
- Genus: Kalophrynus
- Species: K. minusculus

Binomial name
- Kalophrynus minusculus Iskandar, 1998

Species of frog

Kalophrynus minusculus is a species of frog in the family Microhylidae. It is endemic to Indonesia and occurs on extreme western Java and on the southeastern tip of Sumatra. It is a relatively small frog, as suggested by its specific name minusculus and vernacular names small sticky frog and dwarf sticky frog.

== Description ==
Adult males grow to 25 mm (1.0 in) and adult females to (based on a single specimen) 35 mm (1.4 in) in snout–vent length. The head is wider than it is long. The eyes are moderately large. The tympana are visible and smaller than the eyes. The dorsum is brownish black with darker bands and stripes.

Females lay 30–50 eggs that hatch into non-feeding tadpoles.

== Habitat and conservation ==
Kalophrynus minusculus occurs in lowland forests, including degraded, patchy forests with canopy cover. It can be found in large numbers during the reproductive season when it breeds in temporary pools on the forest floor. However, at other times, it is difficult to find because it is well camouflaged with the forest substrate.

It is threatened by habitat loss caused by logging and agricultural encroachment, especially on Java. It is present in the Ujung Kulon National Park (Java) and Bukit Barisan Selatan National Park (Sumatra).
