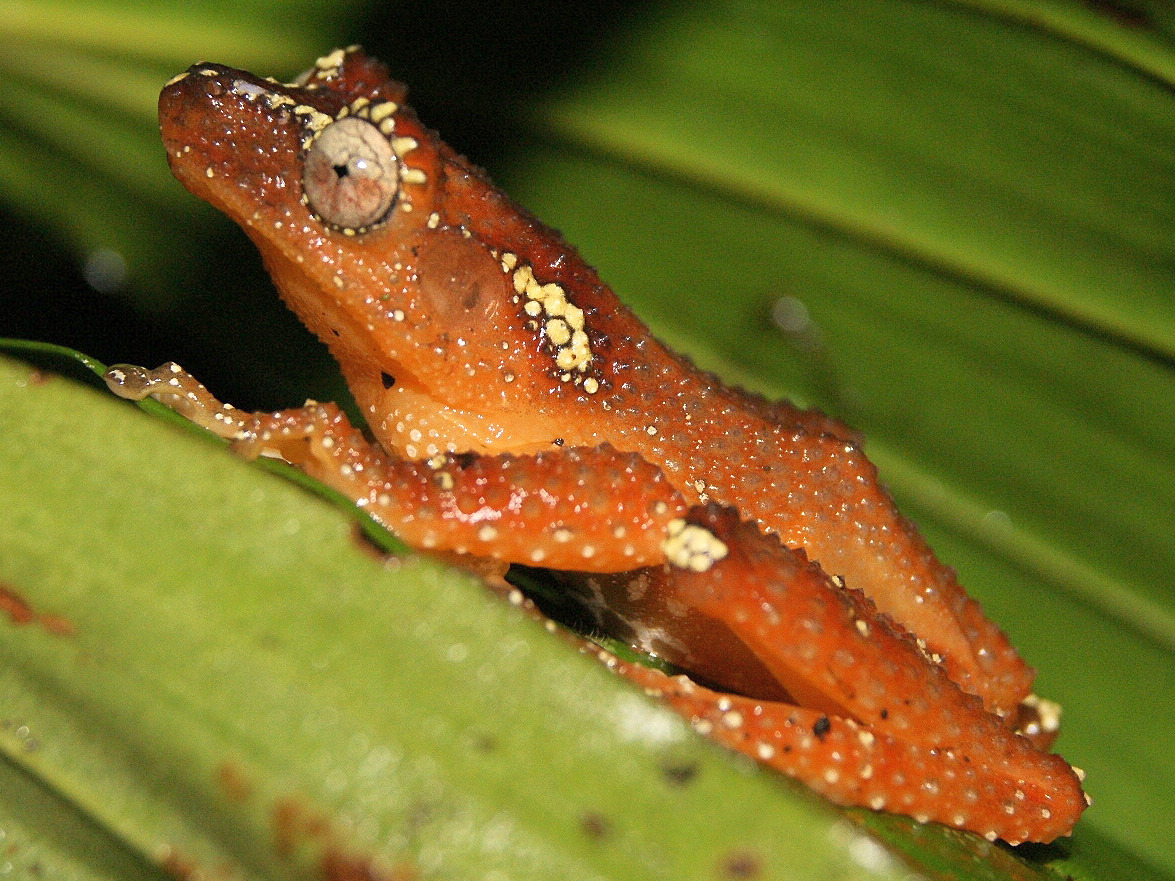
- In Java, Indonesia

Conservation status
- Least Concern (IUCN 3.1)

Scientific classification
- Kingdom: Animalia
- Phylum: Chordata
- Class: Amphibia
- Order: Anura
- Family: Rhacophoridae
- Genus: Nyctixalus
- Species: N. margaritifer

Binomial name
- Nyctixalus margaritifer Boulenger, 1882

Synonyms
- Ixalus flavosignatus Boettger, 1893; Philautus flavosignatus — Smith, 1931; Philautus pictus margaritifer — Inger, 1966; Nyctixalus pictus margaritifer — Dubois, 1981; Nyctixalus flavosignatus — Dubois, 1981; Theloderma margaritifer (Boulenger, 1882)

= Nyctixalus margaritifer =

Species of frog

Nyctixalus margaritifer, also known as the Java Indonesian treefrog and pearly tree frog, is a species of frog in the family Rhacophoridae. It is endemic to Java, Indonesia, where it is known from a number of records at elevations above 700 m (2,300 ft).

== Description ==
Adult males measure 30–33 mm (1.2–1.3 in) and adult females 31–43 mm (1.2–1.7 in) in snout–vent length. The body is slender and flattened. The tympanum is distinct. The fingers and toes are slender and bear medium-sized terminal discs. Skin is coarsely granular. Coloration is orange to dark brown, with yellow spots on the eyelids and shoulders.

== Habitat and conservation ==
Nyctixalus margaritifer occurs in undisturbed highland forests, but it is also known from coffee plantations with adequate forest canopy cover. Breeding takes place in water-filled tree holes, where the tadpoles develop.

Nyctixalus margaritifer is a rare species. It is threatened by forest loss. It is found in Mount Halimun Salak National Park and Gunung Gede Pangrango National Park. There is also an unconfirmed record from Mount Merapi National Park. Single specimens are also known from Telaga Warna Nature Reserve and from very close to Gunung Sigogor Nature Reserve.
