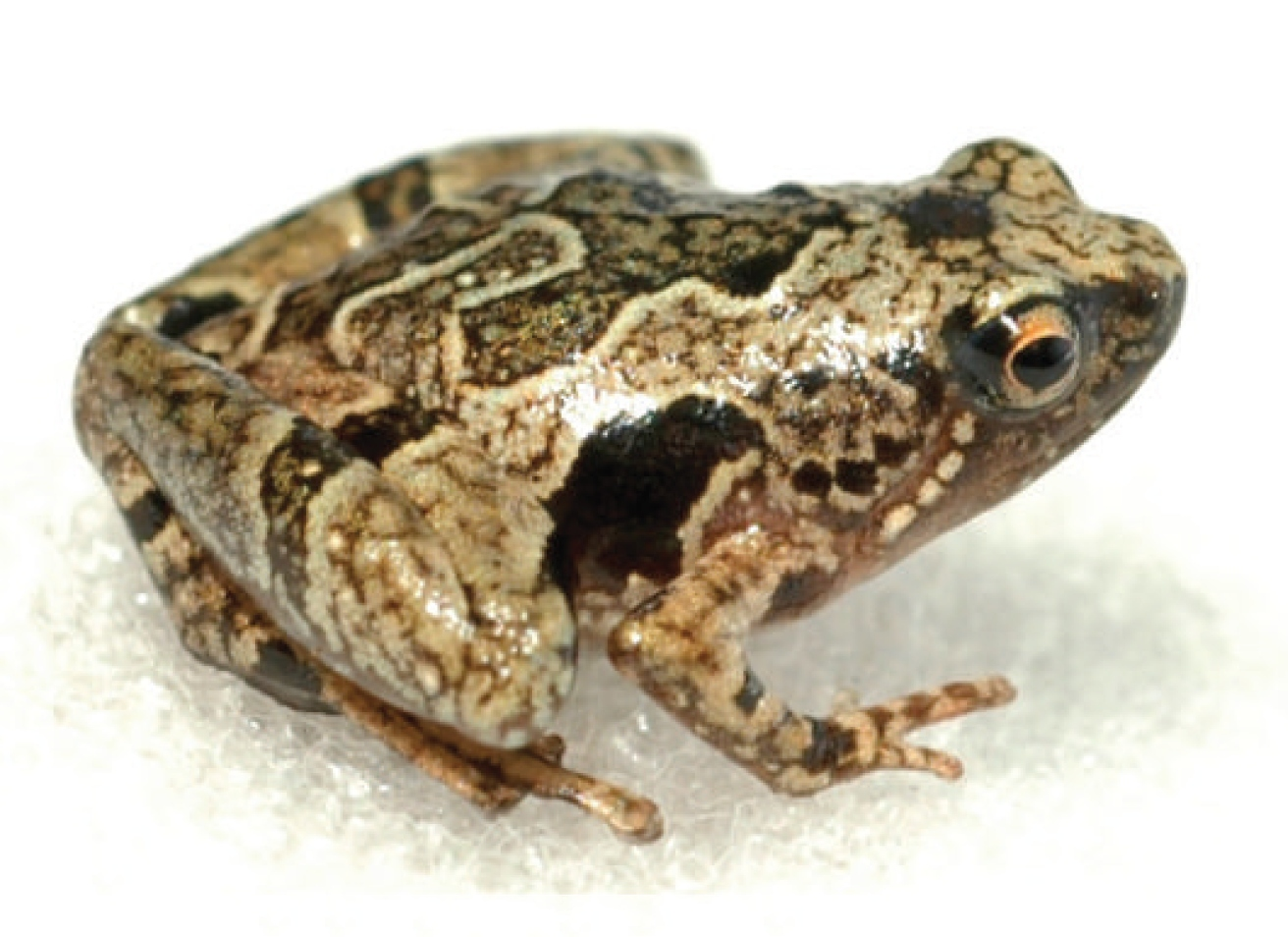

Conservation status
- Least Concern (IUCN 3.1)

Scientific classification
- Kingdom: Animalia
- Phylum: Chordata
- Class: Amphibia
- Order: Anura
- Family: Microhylidae
- Genus: Nanohyla
- Species: N. petrigena

Binomial name
- Nanohyla petrigena (Inger and Frogner, 1979)

Synonyms
- Microhyla petrigena Inger and Frogner, 1979

= Nanohyla petrigena =

Species of frog

Nanohyla petrigena is a species of frog in the family Microhylidae. It is found in northern and central Borneo (Brunei, southeastern Sabah and central Sarawak, Malaysia, and central Kalimantan, Indonesia) and in the Sulu Archipelago of the Philippines. The common names pothole narrow-mouthed frog and Kapit rice frog have been coined for the species.

== Taxonomy ==
N. petrigena was formerly placed in the genus Microhyla, but a 2021 study using morphological and phylogenetic evidence moved nine species (including N. petrigena) to a new genus, Nanohyla.

== Description ==
Nanohyla petrigena is a small frog: adult males measure 14–16 mm (0.6–0.6 in) and adult females 15–18 mm (0.6–0.7 in) in snout–vent length. Its hands have only three fingers. The dorsum is colored in shades of brown. There are dark markings on the shoulder and a light band on the flank. The venter is dark with an irregular white blotch.

The male advertisement call is a single, pulsed note, emitted in series consisting of maximally 15 notes. Call repetition rate is about 0.7 per second, declining towards the end of the series.

== Habitat and conservation ==
Nanohyla petrigena occurs in lowland primary rainforests at elevations below 700 m (2,300 ft). It lives in leaf litter. Breeding takes place in small pot-holes on rocky banks of clear streams and rivers and appears to be restricted to certain nights. The egg masses float on the surface of these pools. The tadpoles feed in mid-water.

This species appears not to be able to adapt to modified habitats. It is threatened by habitat loss caused by logging and conversion in palm oil plantations; the type locality has already been destroyed and species has likely disappeared from there. However, the species occurs in several protected areas.
