= Philautus aurifasciatus =

Conservation status
- Least Concern (IUCN 3.1)

Scientific classification
- Kingdom: Animalia
- Phylum: Chordata
- Class: Amphibia
- Order: Anura
- Family: Rhacophoridae
- Genus: Philautus
- Species: P. aurifasciatus

Binomial name
- Philautus aurifasciatus (Schlegel, 1837)

Species of frog

Philautus aurifasciatus is a species of frog in the family Rhacophoridae. It is endemic to Indonesia. It has been observed solely at elevations higher than 900 meters above sea level.

This frog is listed as least concern because of its large range, which includes protected parks. It lives in montane and submontane forests.

This frog lays eggs in holes in trees, where it grows via direct development with no free-swimming tadpole stage.
