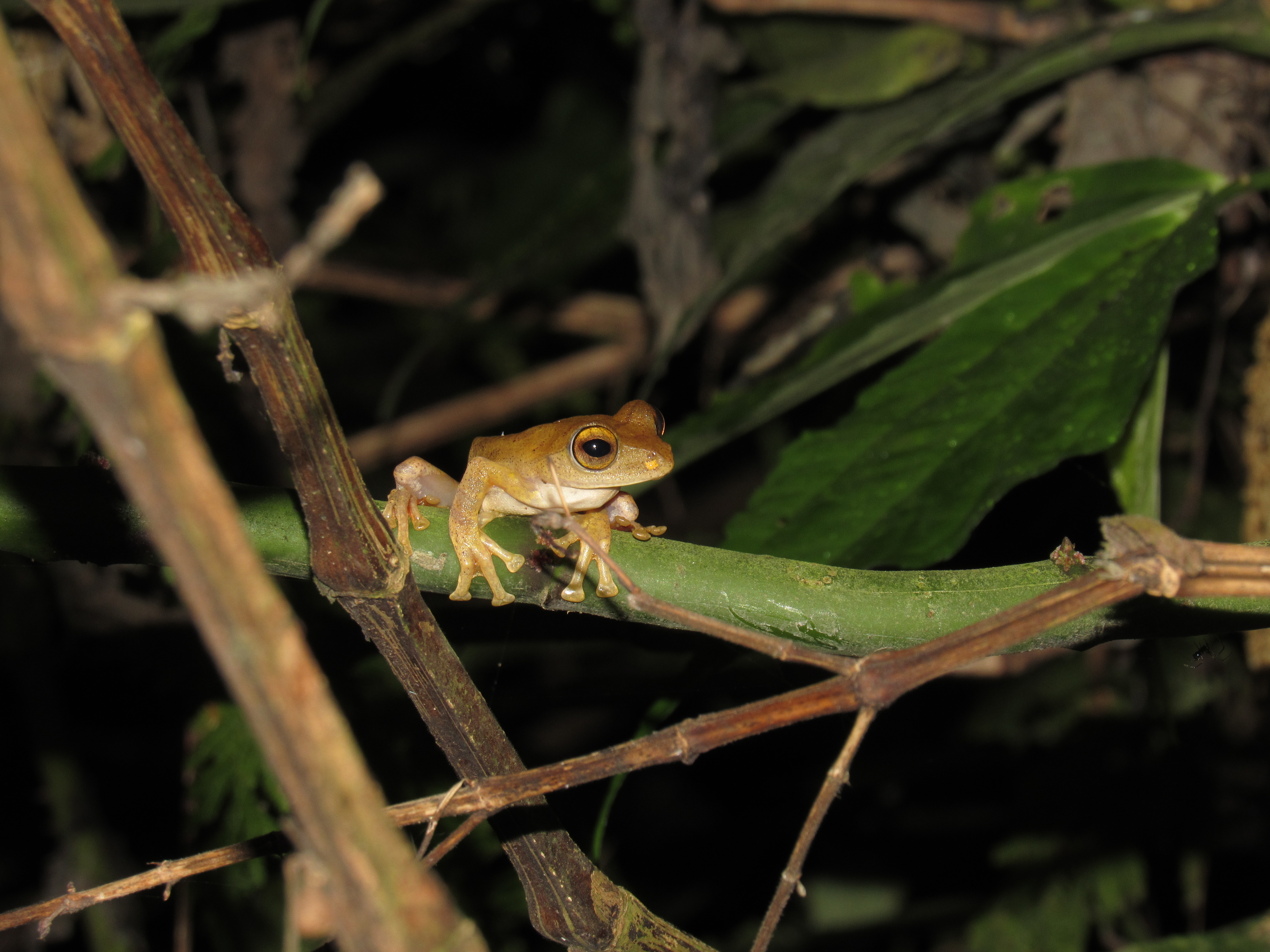

Conservation status
- Least Concern (IUCN 3.1)

Scientific classification
- Kingdom: Animalia
- Phylum: Chordata
- Class: Amphibia
- Order: Anura
- Family: Rhacophoridae
- Genus: Rhacophorus
- Species: R. margaritifer

Binomial name
- Rhacophorus margaritifer (Schlegel, 1837)

Synonyms
- Hyla margaritifera Schlegel, 1837; Rhacophorus javanus Boettger, 1893; Polypedates javanus (Boettger, 1893); Rhacophorus barbouri Ahl, 1927

= Rhacophorus margaritifer =

Species of frog

Rhacophorus margaritifer, also known as the Java flying frog or Javan tree frog, is a species of frog in the family Rhacophoridae. It is endemic to Java, Indonesia. It is known from several areas in Java. It is locally known as katak-parasut jawa.

== Description ==
In a series collected from Taman Safari Park, males measure 41–45 mm (1.6–1.8 in) and a female 63 mm (2.5 in) in snout–vent length. The snout is subacuminate when viewed from above and rounded in lateral view. The tympanum is visible but very distinct. The supratympanic fold is moderate. Skin is dorsally smooth and ventrally weakly areolate. The arms are short and slender, whereas the hind limbs are long and slender. The fingers and toes bear discs and have some webbing (more so in the female). In preserved specimens, dorsal ground color is tan, brown, or gray. Males have some black specks.

Rhacophorus margaritifer can display unken reflex.

== Habitat and conservation ==
Rhacophorus margaritifer occurs in both lowland and montane forests, including in disturbed forests, at elevations of 900–1,795 m (2,953–5,889 ft) above sea level. Breeding takes place in streams. This species is threatened by habitat loss associated with smallholder farming and subsistence wood collecting. Also Batrachochytrium dendrobatidis has been detected in it, although this is not known to be associated with declines. It is present in the pet trade, with an annual quota of 900 specimens. It occurs in several protected areas.
