= Feihyla vittiger =

Conservation status
- Near Threatened (IUCN 3.1)

Scientific classification
- Kingdom: Animalia
- Phylum: Chordata
- Class: Amphibia
- Order: Anura
- Family: Rhacophoridae
- Genus: Feihyla
- Species: F. vittiger

Binomial name
- Feihyla vittiger (Boulenger, 1897)

Synonyms
- Ixalus vittiger Boulenger, 1897; Philautus vittiger (Boulenger, 1897); Rhacophorus vittiger (Boulenger, 1897); Chiromantis vittiger (Boulenger, 1897); Chirixalus vittiger (Chen et al., 2020)

Species of frog

Feihyla vittiger is a species of frog in the family Rhacophoridae. It is endemic to West Java, Indonesia, and has been recorded in Mount Halimun Salak National Park and Pangalengan. Common names Indonesian bubble-nest frog and wine-coloured tree bubble-nest frog have been proposed for it.

== Habitat and conservation ==
Feihyla vittiger occurs in vegetation surrounding ponds in mostly secondary montane forest at elevations of 950–1,219 m (3,117–3,999 ft) above sea level; it can also be found in ponds near pine and tea plantations. Females lay their eggs on leaves overhanging ponds and attend to them until the eggs hatch into free-living tadpoles.

Feihyla vittiger can be locally common. It is potentially threatened by habitat loss caused by small-scale farming, provided that the vegetation surrounding ponds in the plantations is completely removed. It is present in a number of small protected areas and in the Mount Halimun Salak National Park.
