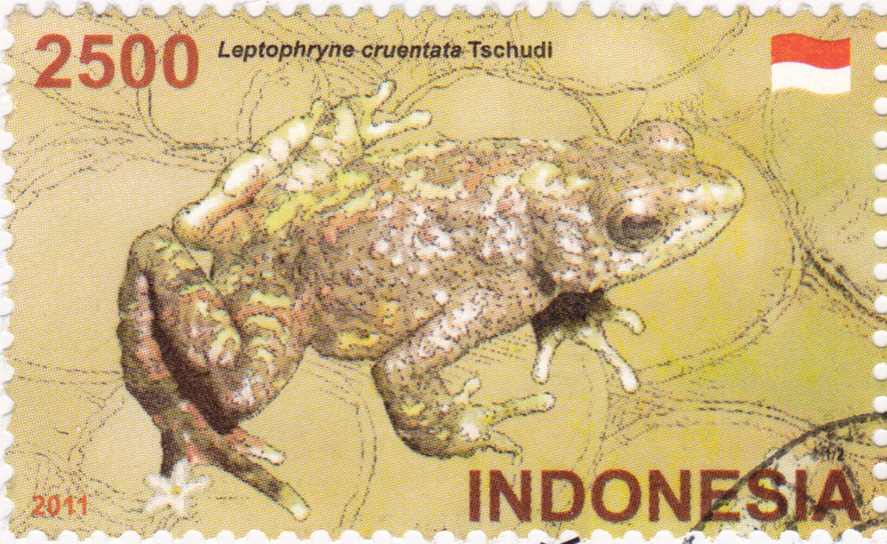

Conservation status
- Critically Endangered (IUCN 3.1)

Scientific classification
- Kingdom: Animalia
- Phylum: Chordata
- Class: Amphibia
- Order: Anura
- Family: Bufonidae
- Genus: Leptophryne
- Species: L. cruentata

Binomial name
- Leptophryne cruentata (Tschudi, 1838)

Synonyms
- Bufo cruentatus Tschudi, 1838; Cacophryne cruentata (Tschudi, 1838); Bufo montanus Werner, 1897

= Bleeding toad =

Species of amphibian

The bleeding toad, fire toad or Indonesian tree toad (Leptophryne cruentata) is a species of true toad in the amphibian family Bufonidae, endemic to Java, Indonesia. L. javanica was, formerly, synonymous with the bleeding toad prior to its description as a distinct species in 2018, although the degree of differentiation between these species is low. The bleeding toad is listed as a critically endangered species due to a drastic population decline. The factors behind this decline are unclear, but appear consistent (despite ambiguous observations) with the global spread of chytrid fungus, a particularly lethal fungal spore for frogs and toads; once infected, the animals develop a condition known as chytridiomycosis before ultimately dying.

== Description ==
Bleeding toads are medium-sized toads that have dark red/purple bodies with blood-red to yellow marbling present on the back and legs. Males measure 20–30 mm (0.79–1.18 in) and females 25–40 mm (0.98–1.57 in) in snout–vent length. They resemble other toads in the family Bufonidae with several distinctions. They have reduced Bidder's organs, and partially fused pectoral epicoracoid cartilage. In addition, they have a slender habitus and elongate limbs. They received the common name "bleeding toad" due to the red back markings and the skin secretions they produce when stressed.

== Distribution ==
Bleeding toads are endemic to western Java and are known from a small number of sites in the Mount Gede Pangrango National Park and from around Mount Halimun Salak National Park. They prefer the boundary zones between the moist lowland areas and mountainous forests, and are at present typically found between altitudes of 1,200–2,000 m (3,900–6,600 ft) above sea level. They breed and lay their eggs in slow moving, vernal streams in which the larvae develop.

== Threats ==
Bleeding toads are listed as critically endangered by the IUCN: once locally abundant, it has declined dramatically and the remaining population is estimated to be no more than 250 adults. It was initially believed that the eruption of Mount Galunggung in 1987 was responsible for a significant portion of this decline due to the loss and degradation of habitat, but at present the decline looks more consistent with chytridiomycosis, as the observed patterns of decline resemble declines of other mountainous stream-breeding amphibians that have been affected by the fungus, but no positive identification of the disease on a bleeding toad has been made. In addition, tourist activities are threatening at least one subpopulation.

The effects of global climate change may also contribute to the decline of the species. As temperatures rise, the range of suitable habitat for many mountainous species is moved to higher elevations. The result of this is a smaller total amount of suitable habitat, that can support smaller populations. Additionally, these populations are often isolated, which can leave them vulnerable to events such as the eruption of Mount Galungung.
