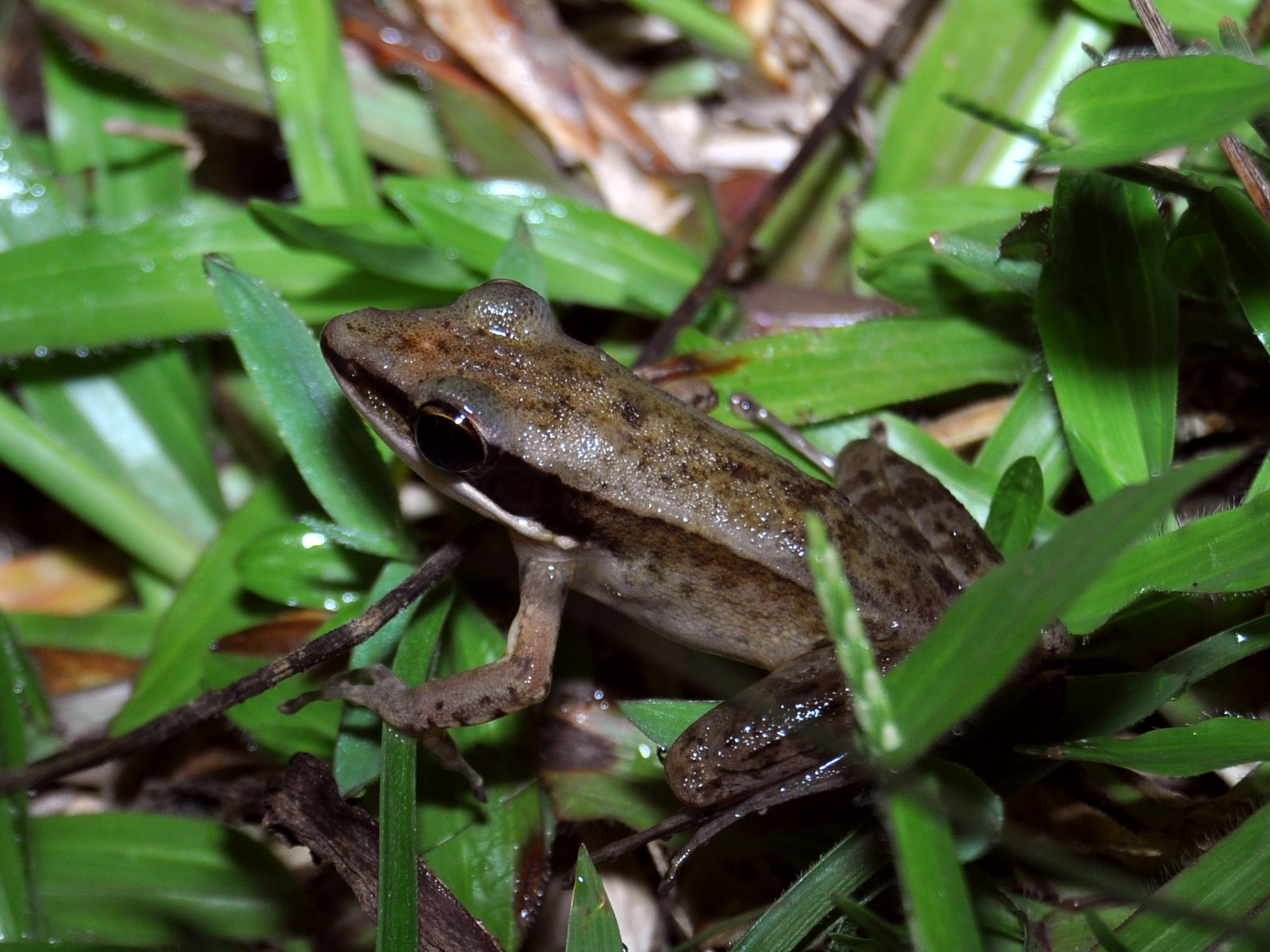
- Hylarana nicobariensis from Jambi, Sumatra

Conservation status
- Least Concern (IUCN 3.1)

Scientific classification
- Domain: Eukaryota
- Kingdom: Animalia
- Phylum: Chordata
- Class: Amphibia
- Order: Anura
- Family: Ranidae
- Genus: Hylarana
- Species: H. nicobariensis

Binomial name
- Hylarana nicobariensis (Stoliczka, 1870)

= Hylarana nicobariensis =

Species of amphibian

Hylarana nicobariensis is an amphibian of the genus Hylarana, which can be found in lowland secondary forests or disturbed areas such as swamps. The species is known from Nicobar Islands (the type locality), Thailand, Peninsular Malaysia, Sumatra, Java, Bali, Borneo and Palawan.
