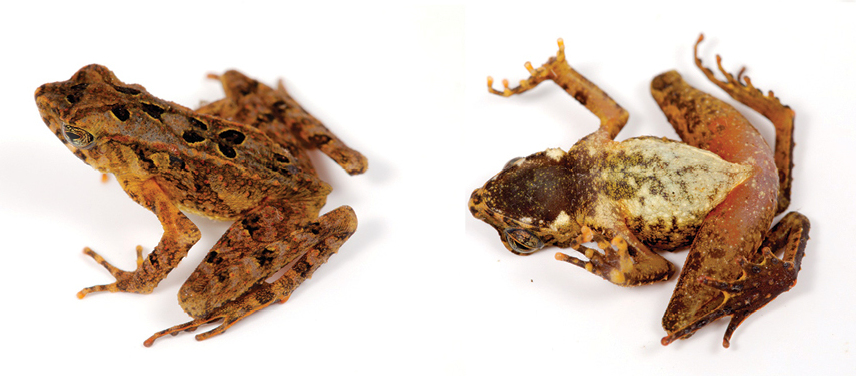
- L. borbonica

Conservation status
- Least Concern (IUCN 3.1)

Scientific classification
- Kingdom: Animalia
- Phylum: Chordata
- Class: Amphibia
- Order: Anura
- Family: Bufonidae
- Genus: Leptophryne
- Species: L. borbonica

Binomial name
- Leptophryne borbonica (Tschudi, 1838)

Synonyms
- Bufo jerboa Boulenger, 1890

= Cross toad =

Species of amphibian

The cross toad, hourglass toad or slender-legged toad (Leptophryne borbonica) is a species of toad in the family Bufonidae. It is found in Indonesia, Malaysia, Thailand, and possibly Brunei and the outskirts of Singapore. Its natural habitat is subtropical to tropical moist lowland forest and subtropical to tropical moist montane forest, typically near creeks and rivers. It is threatened by habitat loss as well as the spread of chytrid fungus.
