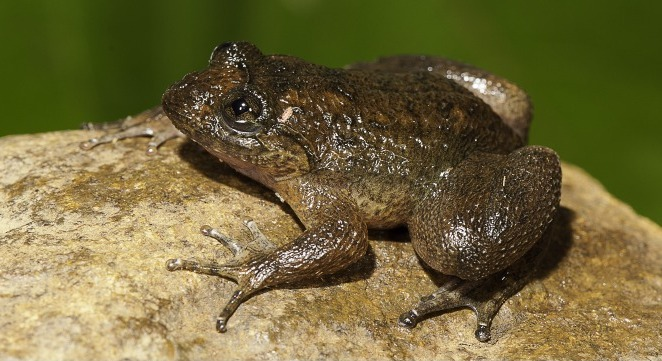

Scientific classification
- Kingdom: Animalia
- Phylum: Chordata
- Class: Amphibia
- Order: Anura
- Family: Nyctibatrachidae
- Genus: Nyctibatrachus
- Species: N. radcliffei

Binomial name
- Nyctibatrachus radcliffei Garg, Suyesh, Sukesan, and Biju, 2017
- N. radcliffei is known only from the Nilgiri Mountains of southern India

= Nyctibatrachus radcliffei =

Species of frog

Nyctibatrachus radcliffei, also known as Radcliffe's night frog or the Thiashola wrinkled frog, is a species of frog in the robust frog family Nyctibatrachidae. It was described in 2017, along with six other species in its genus, by the herpetologist Sonali Garg and her colleagues. A medium-sized frog for its genus, it has an adult male snout–vent length of 32.8–38.3 mm (1.29–1.51 in). It is mainly reddish-brown, with a light flesh-red coloured underside, light brown limbs, and dark grey hands and feet. When preserved in ethanol, it is mostly dark grey, with grayish-white undersides.

The species is endemic to the Western Ghats of India, where it is known only from the Thiashola estate in the Nilgiri Mountains, where the specimens used to describe the species were originally collected. It is found in hill streams at elevations of around 1,920 m (6,300 ft). The species may be threatened by habitat degradation and fragmentation, but has not been assigned a conservation status by the IUCN.

== Taxonomy and systematics ==
Nyctibatrachus radcliffei was described in 2017 by the herpetologist Sonali Garg and her colleagues based on the holotype, an adult male specimen collected from the Thiashola estate in the Nilgiris district of Tamil Nadu, India in 2016. The species is named after Major Richard Radcliffe, a British conservationist, to honour his contribution towards the conservation of wildlife in the Nilgiri Mountains.

There are no subspecies of N. major. It is currently treated as one of 34 species in the night frog genus Nyctibatrachus, in the robust frog family Nyctibatrachidae. According to the 2017 study in which it was described, it is sister (most closely related) to a clade (group of organisms descending from a common ancestor) formed by N. acanthodermis, N. gavi, N. grandis, N. sylvaticus, and N. major. The clade formed by these five species and N. radcliffei is sister to N. indraneili. The following cladogram shows relationships within this clade based on a phylogeny by the study:

- - N. indraneili
  - - N. radcliffei
    - - - - N. grandis
          - N. sylvaticus
        - - - - N. acanthodermis
              - N. gavi
          - N. major

== Description ==
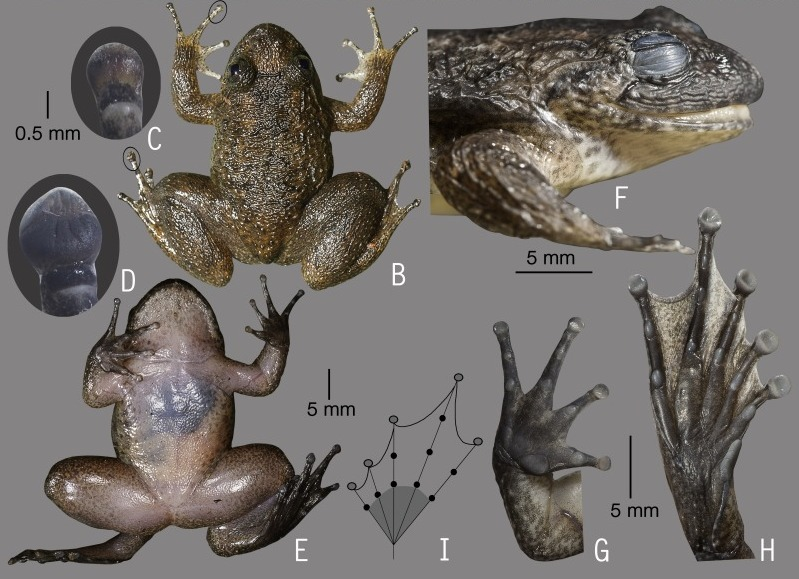
Figure showing different aspects of the species' morphology

N. radcliffei is a medium-sized night frog, with a snout–vent length of 32.8–38.3 mm (1.29–1.51 in) for adult males. The head is wider than it is long, and the snout is longer than the diameter of the eye. The tympanum (external ear) is indistinct, and the skin of the chest, belly, and limbs is rough in texture.

In adult males, the upperside of the body and the sides of head are reddish-brown with scattered blackish-brown spots, with dark brown upper eyelids. The underside of the body is light flesh-red, while the sides of the stomach and hind limbs are light reddish-brown with prominent black speckles. The forelimbs and hind limbs are mostly light brown, with faint brown transverse bands, and the hands and feet are dark grey. The webbing of the feet is light grey with minute black speckles. When preserved in 70% ethanol, the upperside of the body and the sides of head change in colour to dark grey with scattered black spots, while the upper eyelids become dark grey and the underside becomes greyish-white. The sides of the stomach and hind limbs turn grey with dark grey spots, and the hands and feet become dark grey.

N. radcliffei can be distinguished from its congeners by a combination of its middling size; robust body; extensive webbing on the feet; noticeable wrinkling on the skin of the upperside, without conspicuous projections along the spine; a prominent Y-shaped ridge from the upper lip to the nostrils; the presence of the dorso-terminal groove (groove on the upper side of the tip of the digit) on the fourth toe; the absence of the dorso-terminal groove on the third finger; two tubercles on the palm; and the foot and lower leg each being shorter than the thigh and nearly equal in length to each other.

== Distribution, ecology, and conservation ==
N. radcliffei is endemic to the Western Ghats of India, where it is known only from the Thiashola estate in the Nilgiri Mountains north of the Palakkad Gap, where the specimens used to describe the species were originally collected. All known specimens of the frog have been collected from hill streams in a tea estate, hiding in crannies under rocks at elevations of around 1,920 m (6,300 ft).

The species is thought to breed during the early monsoon; tadpoles have been recorded in the month of October. Nuptial pads are absent in the frog, while femoral glands (bulbous glands near the inner thigh) are weakly developed. The species has not yet been assessed by the IUCN. It may be threatened by habitat degradation and fragmentation.
