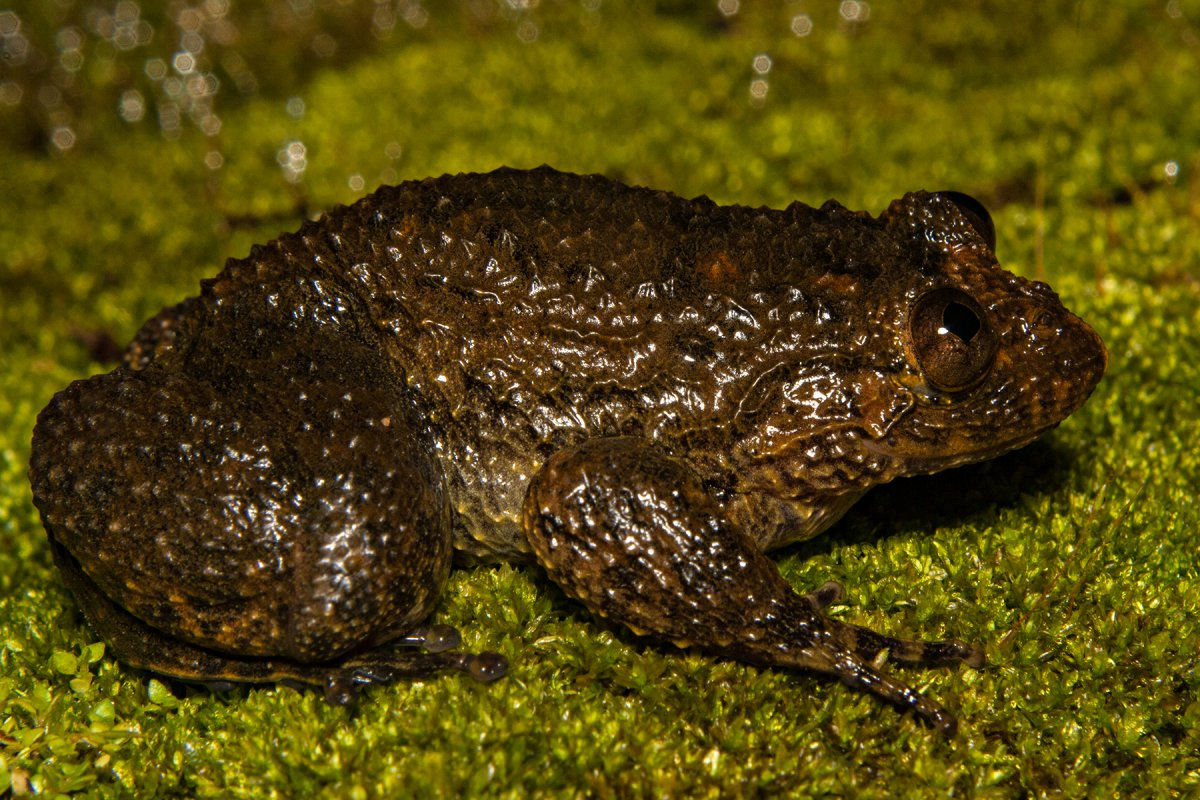

Conservation status
- Not evaluated (IUCN 3.1)

Scientific classification
- Kingdom: Animalia
- Phylum: Chordata
- Class: Amphibia
- Order: Anura
- Family: Nyctibatrachidae
- Genus: Nyctibatrachus
- Species: N. acanthodermis

Binomial name
- Nyctibatrachus acanthodermis Biju, Van Bocxlaer, Mahony, Dinesh, Radhakrishnan, Zachariah, Giri, and Bossuyt, 2011

= Spinular night frog =

Species of amphibian

The spinular night frog (Nyctibatrachus acanthodermis), also known as the spinular wrinkled frog, is a species of frog in the family Nyctibatrachidae, commonly known as the robust frogs. It was described in 2011 as one of 12 new species in its genus by the herpetologist Sathyabhama Das Biju and his colleagues. A large frog for its genus, it has an adult male snout–vent length of 52.9–66.2 mm (2.08–2.61 in). It has a brownish-grey back, a grey underside, dark brown limbs, and dark grey feet. When preserved in ethanol, it is black above with greyish-brown undersides. The species is endemic to the Western Ghats of India, where it is known from the states of Kerala and Tamil Nadu, where the specimens used to describe the species were originally collected. It is found under rocks in streams in forests. The species has not been assigned a conservation status by the IUCN.

== Taxonomy ==
Nyctibatrachus acanthodermis was described in 2011, along with 11 other species in its genus, by the herpetologist Sathyabhama Das Biju and his colleagues based on an adult male specimen collected from Nelliampathi in the Palakkad district of Kerala, India, in 2010. The species's name is from the Greek words acanthos, meaning spine, and dermis, meaning skin, referring to its characteristic spiny skin. It is also called the spinular wrinkled frog.

There are no subspecies of N. acanthodermis. It is one of 34 species in the night frog genus Nyctibatrachus, in the family Nyctibatrachidae, commonly known as the robust frogs. According to a 2017 study by the herpetologist Sonali Garg and colleagues, it is sister (most closely related) to N. gavi. The clade (group of organisms descending from a common ancestor) formed by these two species is sister to another clade formed by N. major. These three species are together sister to a clade formed by N. grandis and N. sylvaticus. The clade of these five species is sister to N. radcliffei, and these six species are sister to N. indraneili. A study from 2014 found a slightly different relationship, with major being sister to gavi, and acanthodermis being sister to that clade. The following cladogram shows relationships within this clade based on a phylogeny by the 2017 study by Sonali Garg and colleagues:

- - N. indraneili
  - - N. radcliffei
    - - - - N. grandis
          - N. sylvaticus
        - - - - N. acanthodermis
              - N. gavi
          - N. major

== Description ==
N. acanthodermis is a large species of night frog, with an adult male snout–vent length of 52.9–66.2 mm (2.08–2.61 in). The head is wider than it is long, and the snout is ovoid and longer than the diameter of the eye. The back is brownish-grey. The upperside of the limbs is dark brown, with dark brown lines across the limbs and fingers. The underside is uniformly grey, darker on the throat, and the thigh, feet, and webbing are dark grey. When preserved in 70% ethanol, the upperside is black and the underside is greyish-brown. The thigh is darker than the rest of the underside, and the chest, hand, feet and webbing are dark grey. Males and females are broadly similar in their external appearance, but can be distinguished by the presence of nuptial pads and femoral glands (bulbous glands near the inner thigh) in males.

The species may be confused with the congeneric N. gavi, N. grandis, and N. radcliffei. It can be distinguished from these species by a combination of its large size; robust body; medium webbing on the feet; noticeable wrinkling on the skin of the upperside, with conspicuous projections along the spine; a prominent Y-shaped ridge from the upper lip to the nostrils; the presence of the dorso-terminal groove (groove on the upper side of the tip of the digit) on the fourth toe; the absence of the dorso-terminal groove on the third finger; and the lower leg being longer than the foot and nearly equal in length to the thigh.

== Distribution, ecology, and conservation ==
N. acanthodermis is endemic to the Western Ghats of India, where it is known from Nelliampathi in Palakkad, Kerala, and from the Valparai Plateau in Coimbatore district, Tamil Nadu. The specimens used to describe the species were collected from under rocks in streams in a region of secondary forest. Frogs from Tamil Nadu inhabited pools in swiftly flowing streams. Females lay large pigmented eggs with a diameter of 2.2–2.8 mm (0.087–0.110 in). The species has not yet been assessed by the IUCN.
