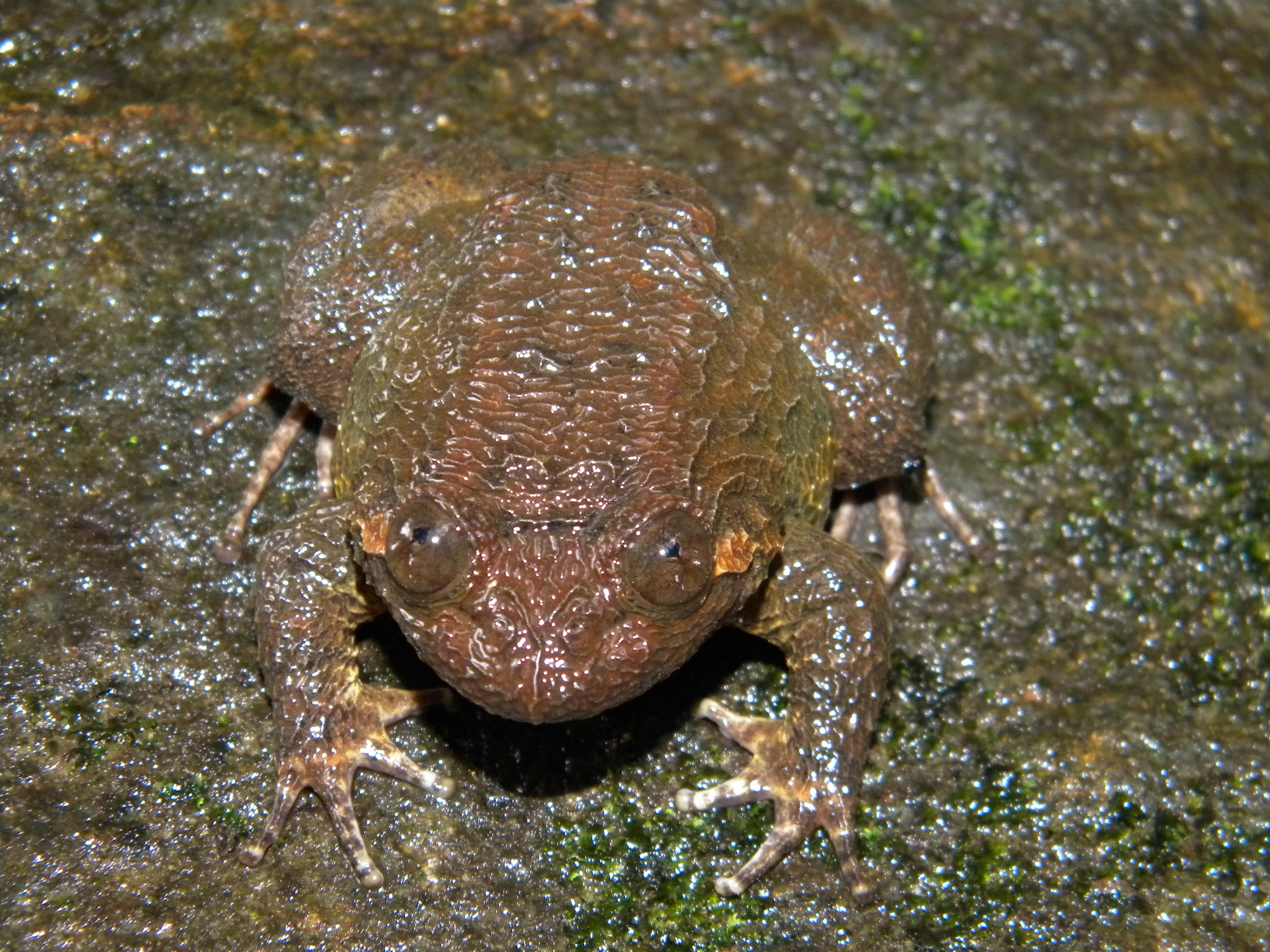

Conservation status
- Endangered (IUCN 3.1)

Scientific classification
- Kingdom: Animalia
- Phylum: Chordata
- Class: Amphibia
- Order: Anura
- Family: Nyctibatrachidae
- Genus: Nyctibatrachus
- Species: N. major

Binomial name
- Nyctibatrachus major Boulenger, 1882
- Range of N. major; reports of the species from Maharashtra are probably erroneous

Synonyms
- Rana travancorica Annandale, 1910

= Nyctibatrachus major =

Species of amphibian

Nyctibatrachus major, the Malabar night frog, large wrinkled frog, or Boulenger's narrow-eyed frog, is a species of frog in the family Nyctibatrachidae, commonly known as the robust frogs. It was described in 1882 by the zoologist George Albert Boulenger, and is the type species of the genus Nyctibatrachus. It is a large frog for its genus, with an adult snout–vent length of 31.5–52.0 mm (1.24–2.05 in) for males and 43.7–54.2 mm (1.72–2.13 in) for females. It is mainly brownish to greyish in colour, with a dark greyish-brown upperside, a greyish-white underside, and light grey sides. It also has a variety of grey or brown markings. When preserved in ethanol, it is mostly greyish-brown to grey, with whitish sides. Sexes can be told apart by the presence of the femoral glands (bulbous glands near the inner thigh) in males.

The species is endemic to the Western Ghats mountain range of India, where it is found in Kerala, Tamil Nadu, and Karnataka. Adults inhabit fast-moving forest streams at elevations of up to 900 m (3,000 ft) and have highly specific habitat requirements. Adults are mostly found in or near water and are nocturnal; subadults can be found during both the night and day. Its diet mainly consists of other frogs and insect larvae. Over a period of several days or weeks, females lay multiple small clutches of eggs on leaves and rocks overhanging water; tadpoles drop into the water below on hatching. The species is currently classified as being endangered on the IUCN Red List owing to its small and severely fragmented range and ongoing habitat degradation. Threats to the species include habitat loss, increased human presence near the streams it inhabits, and possibly nitrate pollution caused by fertiliser overuse.

== Taxonomy ==
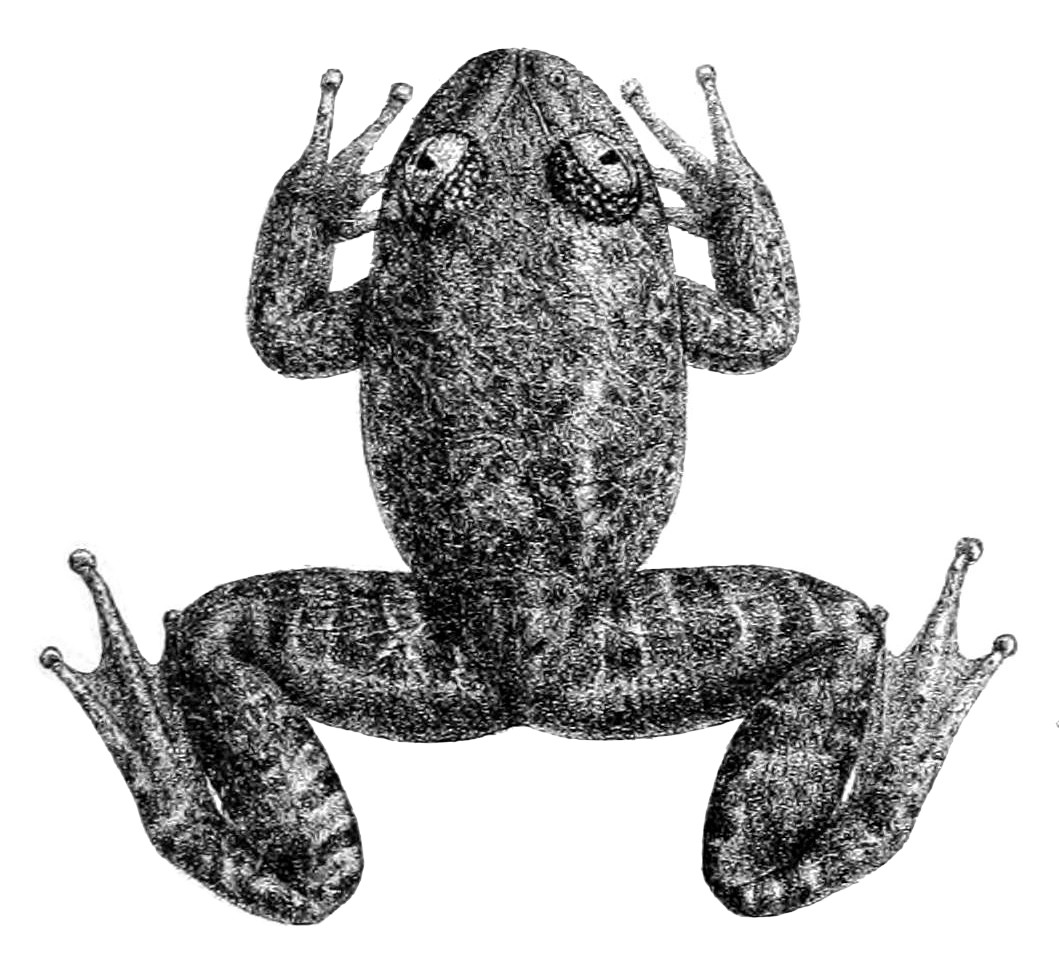
Illustration of N. major from the 1882 description

The zoologist George Albert Boulenger formally described the species as Nyctibatrachus major in 1882 on the basis of twelve type specimens from what he referred to as "Wynaad" and "Malabar", creating the genus Nyctibatrachus in the same publication. N. major was subsequently designated as the type species of Nyctibatrachus in 1942 by the American herpetologist George Myers. In 1910, zoologist Nelson Annandale described the species Rana travancorica on the basis of specimens collected from Travancore, presumably because of the shape of the pupils in these specimens, which was typical of the genus Rana. This species was synonymised with N. major by the herpetologist Raghavan Pillai in 1978, as he found the shape of the pupil to be a variable characteristic in preserved specimens. Although this synonymisation was disputed by the herpetologist Sushil Dutta in 1997, it has since been found to be valid and R. travancorica is currently treated as a synonym of N. major. In 2011, the herpetologist Sathyabhama Biju and colleagues re-examined the specimens from which the species was described, and concluded that several of these actually represented species distinct from N. major; they then designated an adult female collected from "Malabar" as the lectotype to avoid subsequent taxonomic uncertainty and ensure that the genus Nyctibatrachus could be tied to a single type species.

There are no subspecies of N. major. It is currently treated as one of 34 species in the night frog genus Nyctibatrachus, in the family Nyctibatrachidae, commonly known as the robust frogs. According to a 2017 study by the herpetologist Sonali Garg and colleagues, within the genus, it is sister (most closely related) to a clade (group of organisms descending from a common ancestor) formed by N. acanthodermis and N. gavi. These three species are further sister to a clade formed by N. grandis and N. sylvaticus. The clade of these five species is sister to N. radcliffei, and these six species are sister to N. indraneili. A study from 2014 found a slightly different relationship, with major being sister to gavi, and acanthodermis being sister to that clade. The following cladogram shows relationships within this clade based on a phylogeny from the 2017 study by Sonali Garg and colleagues:

- - N. indraneili
  - - N. radcliffei
    - - - - N. grandis
          - N. sylvaticus
        - - - - N. acanthodermis
              - N. gavi
          - N. major

The species had its DNA barcoded in 2010. This barcoding allows unknown specimens of the frog to be identified accurately with even small tissue samples, which could help resolve taxonomic uncertainties and aid conservation efforts for the species. The development of species-specific microsatellite markers could offer tools for assessing genetic variation and population dynamics, further informing conservation strategies for this species.

== Description ==
Nyctibatrachus major is a large species of night frog, with an adult snout–vent length of 31.5–52.0 mm (1.24–2.05 in) for males and 43.7–54.2 mm (1.72–2.13 in) for females; other species in the "large" group of Nyctibatrachus range in size from 41 to 77 mm (1.6 to 3.0 in). The upperside is dark greyish-brown, with variable light grey and dark brown markings, and the underside is greyish-white. The lores (area between the eyes and nostrils) and area around the tympanum (external ear) are dark brown, with a dark grey stripe between the eyelids, and the irises are dark brown. The sides of the belly are light grey, mottled with white and dark grey, and the groin is dark brown. The limbs are brown with pale diagonal bands. When preserved in 70% ethanol, the colour of the upperside changes to greyish-brown, marked variably with pale and dark brown. The colour of the band between the eyelids changes to faint grey, and the underside and sides become whitish, the latter marked with black spots. Males and females are broadly similar in their external appearance, but can be distinguished by the presence of the femoral glands (bulbous glands near the inner thigh) in males. Like other frogs in the genus, it has two rows of vomerine teeth along each vomerine ridge and a bluish-black liver that can be seen through the skin of the underside. Male frogs also have two vocal sacs, which are seen as an internal pair of slits at the back of the lower jaw. The sacs expand towards the sides and to a large size when inflated.

The species may be confused with several other species in its genus, namely N. dattatreyaensis, N. humayuni, N. indraneili, N. jog, N. karnatakaensis, N. petraeus and N. vrijeuni. It can be distinguished from these species by its large size; well-developed toe and finger discs; the absence of a groove on the third finger disc; the presence of a groove on the fourth toe disc; conspicuous wrinkling and glandular protrusions on the skin of the upperside; medium-sized webbing between the fingers; and a prominent Y-shaped ridge from the upper lip to the nostrils.

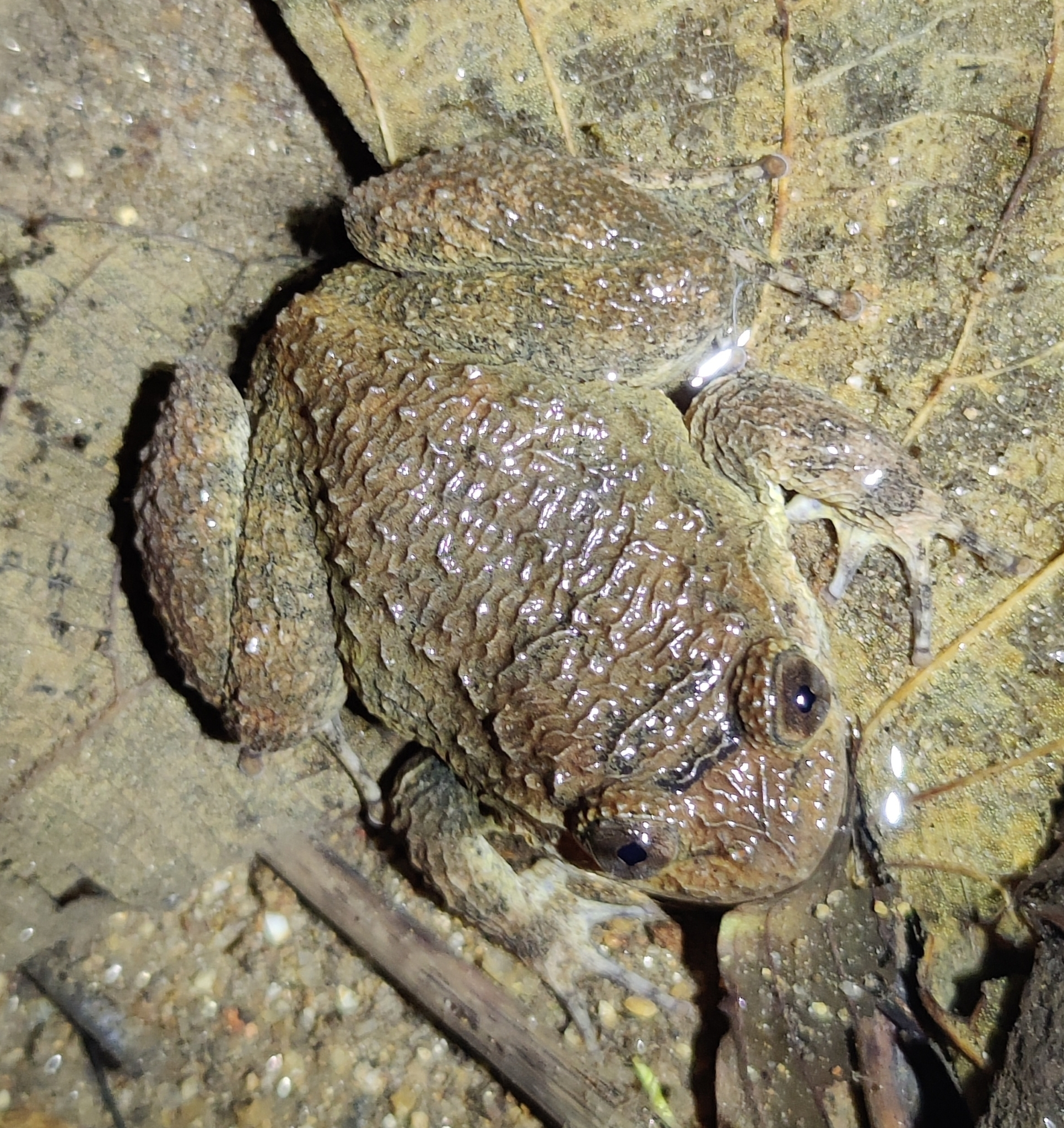
Dorsal view

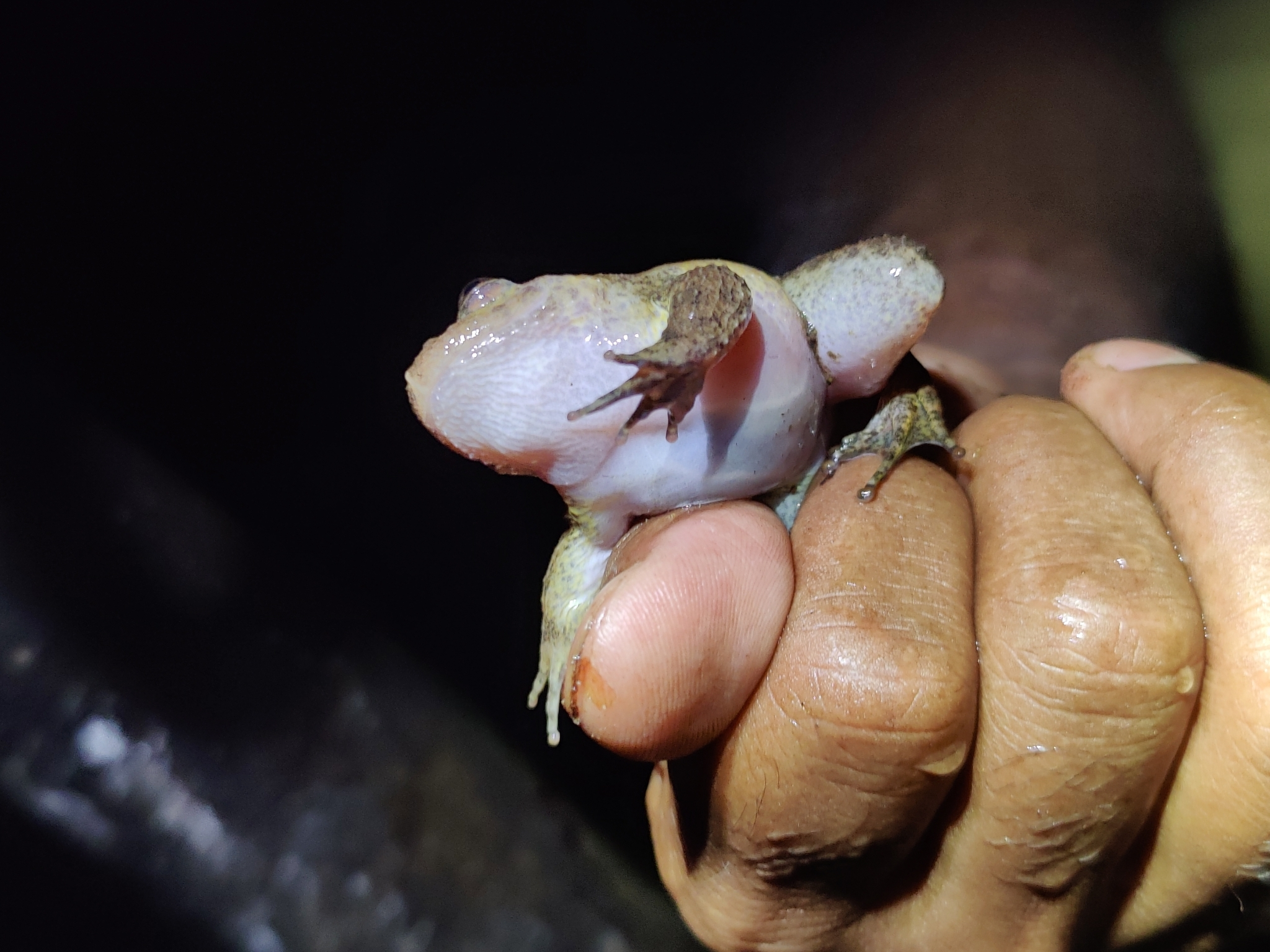
Ventral view

=== Tadpoles ===
Tadpoles of the species are mainly black, with a brown body, brown underside of head, and a mostly white tail. There are two long pale marks on the lower back, and the tail has darks bands near the front. Tadpoles have a maximum length of 5.2 cm (2.0 in), of which one-half to two-thirds is the tail. Their heads and bodies are roughly egg-shaped and somewhat flattened, and the mouth is small with no teeth. After reaching a length of 1.5–1.9 cm (0.59–0.75 in), tadpoles have only a tail stump and begin metamorphosing; they can be distinguished from adults by the lack of grooves on the fingers.

=== Vocalizations ===
Advertisement calls consist of solitary notes 0.05 seconds long, delivered around 20 seconds apart. The calls are mainly delivered in a frequency band of 0.6–1.9 kHz, the frogs modulating calls significantly at the higher end of this range, although some calls are also delivered at a frequency of around 2.43 kHz.

== Habitat and distribution ==
The species is endemic to the Western Ghats of southern India, where it is found in Kerala, Tamil Nadu, and Karnataka. It was previously thought to also occur in Maharashtra, but those records are likely erroneous. Adults inhabit fast-moving streams in evergreen deciduous forest, secondary forest, and forest edge at elevations of 0–900 m (0–2,950 ft). They prefer undisturbed forest, and generally are not found in highly degraded habitats or in open areas near the boundary of a forest. In particular, streams inhabited by adults are slightly acidic (pH of 6.0–6.5), with low temperatures (18–24.5 °C (64–76 °F)), low light intensities, and low concentrations of calcium carbonate, as well as high levels of dissolved oxygen. Tadpoles also have highly specific requirements for their microhabitat, preferring streams with low air and water temperatures, low light intensity and dense canopy cover, high humidity, and large amounts of leaf litter. Tadpoles have been found at elevations up to 825 m (2,700 ft).

== Ecology ==
Adults are mostly nocturnal and spend most of their time in aquatic environments, most commonly being seen on rocks near water. During the day, adults typically conceal themselves below rocks, but subadults are more active. When disturbed or threatened, they scramble through the mud of the streambed and stay underwater for some time before coming to the surface again. Other observers have found that they rarely bury themselves in mud or try to exit the water and hide in nearby undergrowth.

=== Diet ===
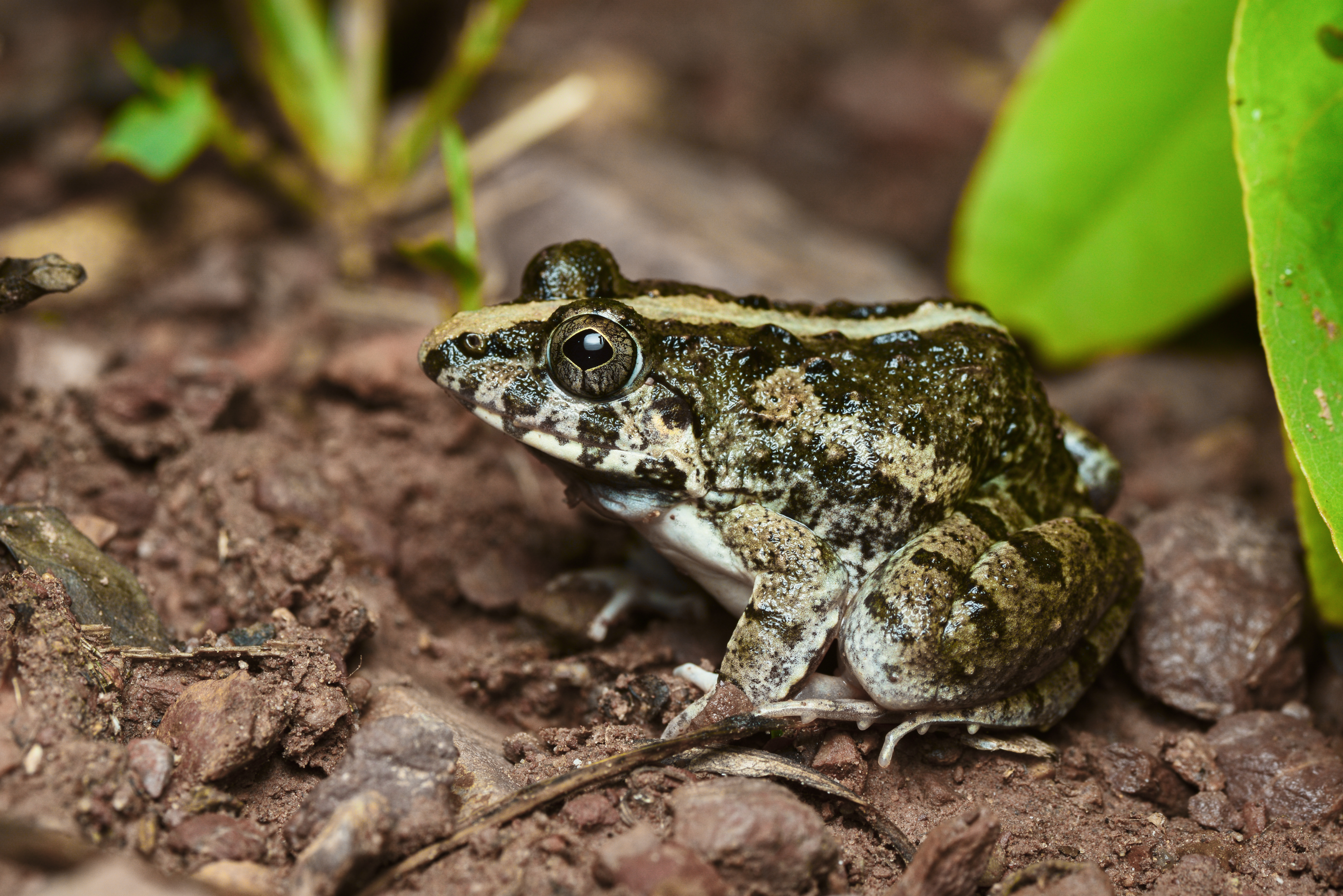
N. major feeds on several species of frog, such as Fejervarya limnocharis (pictured)

Nyctibatrachus major mainly feeds on insect larvae and other frogs. It consumes insects like dragonflies in the genus Ophiogomphus, beetles in the genera Psephenus and Enochrus and the families Dytiscidae and Haliplidae, true bugs in the genus Neides, and springtails in the genus Sminthurinus. Frogs that N. major feeds on include Fejervarya limnocharis, Euphlyctis cyanophlyctis, and Micrixalus saxicola; the especially high rates at which the species predates F. limnocharis and E. cyanophlyctis may be due to the fact that all of these species share the same microhabitat.

=== Reproduction ===
The species' life cycle and breeding behaviour are poorly known. Females with mature eggs have been collected from May to June; tadpoles have been collected in October. Femoral glands are only present in males and seem to show subtle seasonal variation, being longer proportional to total body length from February to September (before and during the monsoon) than from October to January (after the monsoon). This may indicate that these glands have a reproductive function and aid in amplexus (mating). Males also have extremely small testes proportional to their body size, although the reasons for this are unclear. The sperm of the species is rather distinctive, with a loosely coiled, S-shaped head and an unusually thin tail.

Mature eggs are pigmented and have an outer diameter of 4.1 mm (0.16 in). Immature eggs are smaller and colourless. Females possess egg cells undergoing several stages of maturity at any time; this suggests that they lay multiple small clutches of eggs over several days or weeks, instead of one large clutch at once. Eggs are laid on leaves and rocks overhanging water, after which the males guard them until they hatch and the tadpoles fall into the water below. Tadpoles metamorphose into froglets by 98 days.

== Conservation ==
Nyctibatrachus major is classified as being vulnerable on the IUCN Red List due to its small and fragmented range and ongoing habitat degradation. It is threatened by habitat loss caused by factors such as deforestation, wood and timber harvesting, and conversion of land for agricultural use. It is also threatened by the construction of check dams, road construction, and an increase in tourism in its range. Adults and tadpoles of N. major are highly sensitive to changes in their microhabitat. Consequently, increased human activities that alter their habitat may lead to declines in the species' population, as has occurred in the related N. aliciae.

The species may also be threatened by nitrate pollution caused by overuse of fertilisers. Due to habitat fragmentation, many of the streams the frog inhabits are adjacent to farms that experience high levels of nitrogen-based fertilizer use, leading to elevated nitrate concentrations in the water. The LC50 (concentration at which 50% of exposed tadpoles die) for nitrates in the species is 2,510 micrograms (μg) per litre over a 30-day period; nitrate concentrations in streams with N. major tadpoles have been collected vary from 110 to 6,000 μg per litre. Even sub-lethal concentrations of nitrates in the water lead to adverse effects such as paralysis, restlessness, abnormal swimming patterns, and swollen body parts.
