= Malabar frog (disambiguation) =

The Malabar frog (Clinotarsus curtipes) is a frog in the family Ranidae found in the Western Ghats of India.

Malabar frog may also refer to:

- False Malabar gliding frog (Rhacophorus pseudomalabaricus), a frog in the family Rhacophoridae endemic to the Anaimalai Hills of Tamil Nadu and Kerala, India
- Malabar black narrow-mouthed frog (Melanobatrachus indicus), a frog in the family Microhylidae endemic to the southern Western Ghats in Kerala and Tamil Nadu, India
- Malabar gliding frog (Rhacophorus malabaricus), a frog in the family Rhacophoridae found in the Western Ghats of India
- Malabar night frog (Nyctibatrachus major), a frog in the family Nyctibatrachidae endemic to Kerala and Tamil Nadu, India
- Malabar tropical frog (Micrixalus saxicola), a frog in the family Micrixalidae found in the Western Ghats of India
- Malabar wart frog (Zakerana rufescens), a frog in the family Dicroglossidae endemic to the Western Ghats of India
