= Jerdon's frog =

Jerdon's frog may refer to:

- Jerdon's narrow-mouthed frog (Ramanella montana), a frog in the family Microhylidae found in the Western Ghats of India
- Jerdon's olive-brown frog (Micrixalus saxicola), a small frog in the family Micrixalidae found in forest streams in the Western Ghats of India
- Jerdon's tree frog (Hyla annectans), a species of tree frog in the family Hylidae found in China, India, Myanmar, Thailand, and Vietnam, at elevations between 600 and 2500 m
