= Gray frog =

Gray frog may refer to:

- Cope's gray tree frog (Hyla chrysoscelis), a frog in the family Hylidae found in the United States
- Gray balloon frog (Uperodon globulosus), a frog in the family Microhylidae found in India, Nepal, and Bangladesh
- Gray foam-nest tree frog (Chiromantis xerampelina), a frog in the family Rhacophoridae, found in Sub-Saharan Africa
- Gray tree frog (Hyla versicolor), a frog in the family Hylidae native to much of the eastern United States and southeastern Canada
- Merlin's dwarf gray frog (Pseudhymenochirus merlini), a frog in the family Pipidae found in Guinea, Guinea-Bissau, and Sierra Leone
