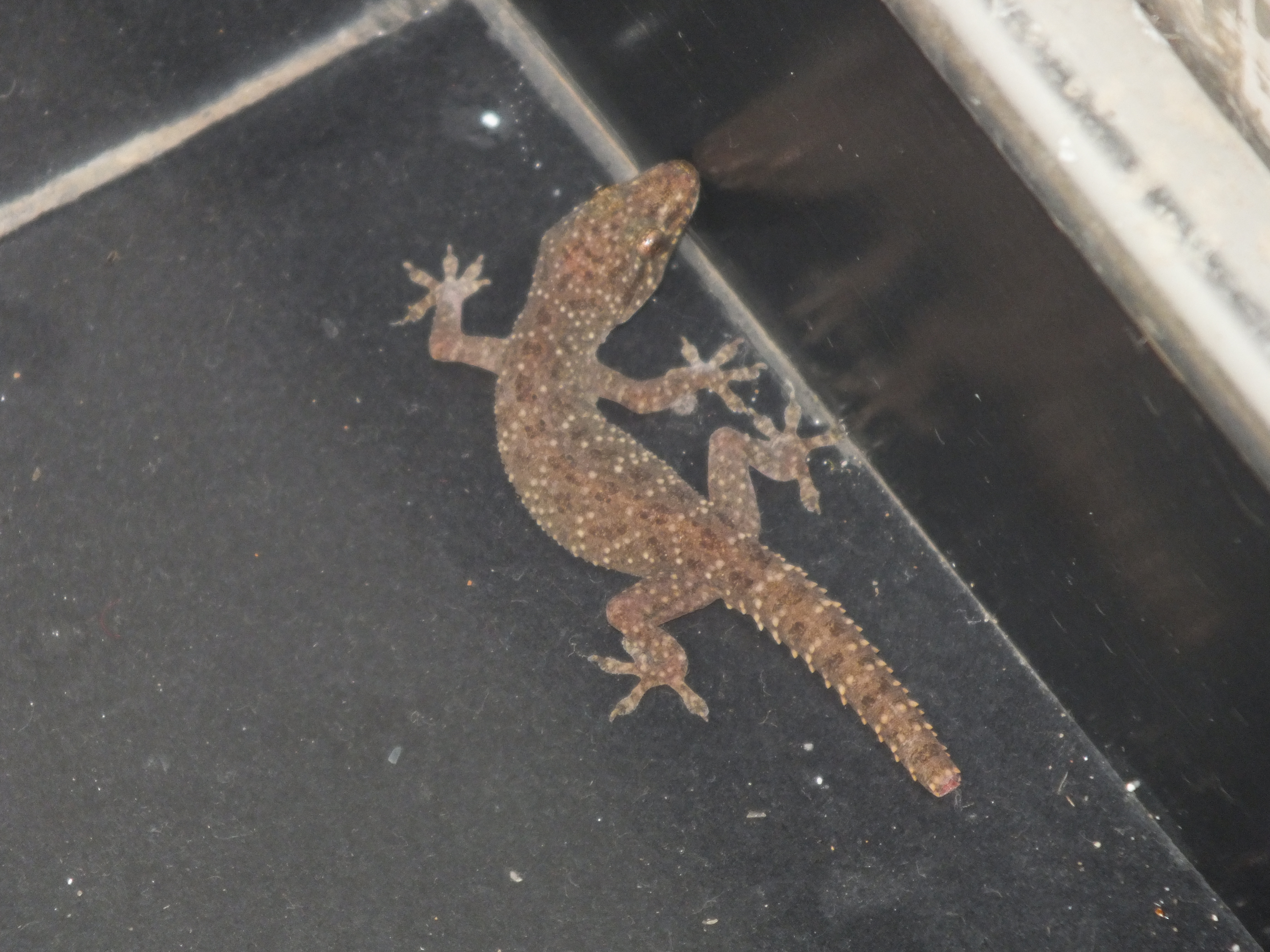

Conservation status
- Least Concern (IUCN 3.1)

Scientific classification
- Kingdom: Animalia
- Phylum: Chordata
- Class: Reptilia
- Order: Squamata
- Suborder: Gekkota
- Family: Gekkonidae
- Genus: Hemidactylus
- Species: H. parvimaculatus

Binomial name
- Hemidactylus parvimaculatus Deraniyagala, 1953

Synonyms
- Hemidactylus brookii parvimaculatus Deraniyagala, 1953; Hemidactylus parvimaculatus – Bauer et al., 2010; Rösler and Glaw, 2010

= Hemidactylus parvimaculatus =

Species of lizard

Hemidactylus parvimaculatus, also known as the spotted house gecko or the Sri Lankan house gecko, is a species of gecko from South Asia and Indian Ocean.

== Description ==
Hemidactylus parvimaculatus can grow to 13 cm (5 in) in length. The body has many tubercles and the tail has rings of small spines. Coloration is light grey to tan; there are dark blotches that form three rows along the back. The belly is pinkish-cream.

== Distribution ==
This gecko is found in Sri Lanka, southern India, Reunion, Mauritius and Rodrigues, Moheli (Comoro Islands), Maldives, and Mascarene Islands. There are also introduced populations in Bangkok, Thailand, and in the southern United States.

== Ecology ==
In Sri Lanka, Hemidactylus parvimaculatus has been recorded to prey upon Ramanella variegata frogs and insects. It can also be cannibalistic.
