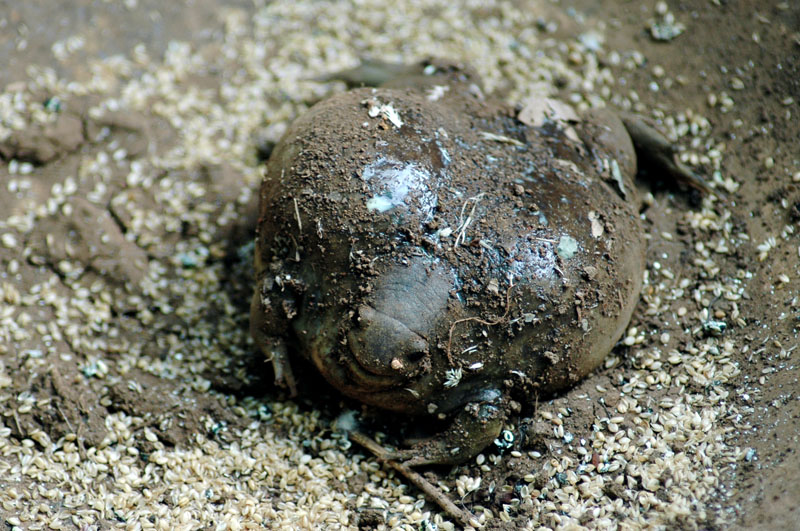

Conservation status
- Least Concern (IUCN 3.1)

Scientific classification
- Kingdom: Animalia
- Phylum: Chordata
- Class: Amphibia
- Order: Anura
- Family: Microhylidae
- Genus: Uperodon
- Species: U. globulosus

Binomial name
- Uperodon globulosus (Günther, 1864)

= Uperodon globulosus =

Species of amphibian

Uperodon globulosus, or Indian balloon frog, is a species of narrow-mouthed frog found in India, Nepal, Bhutan, Myanmar, and Bangladesh. It is known under many common names: Indian globular frog, Indian balloon frog, grey balloon frog, and greater balloon frog. Specimens from the Western Ghats may represent an undescribed species.

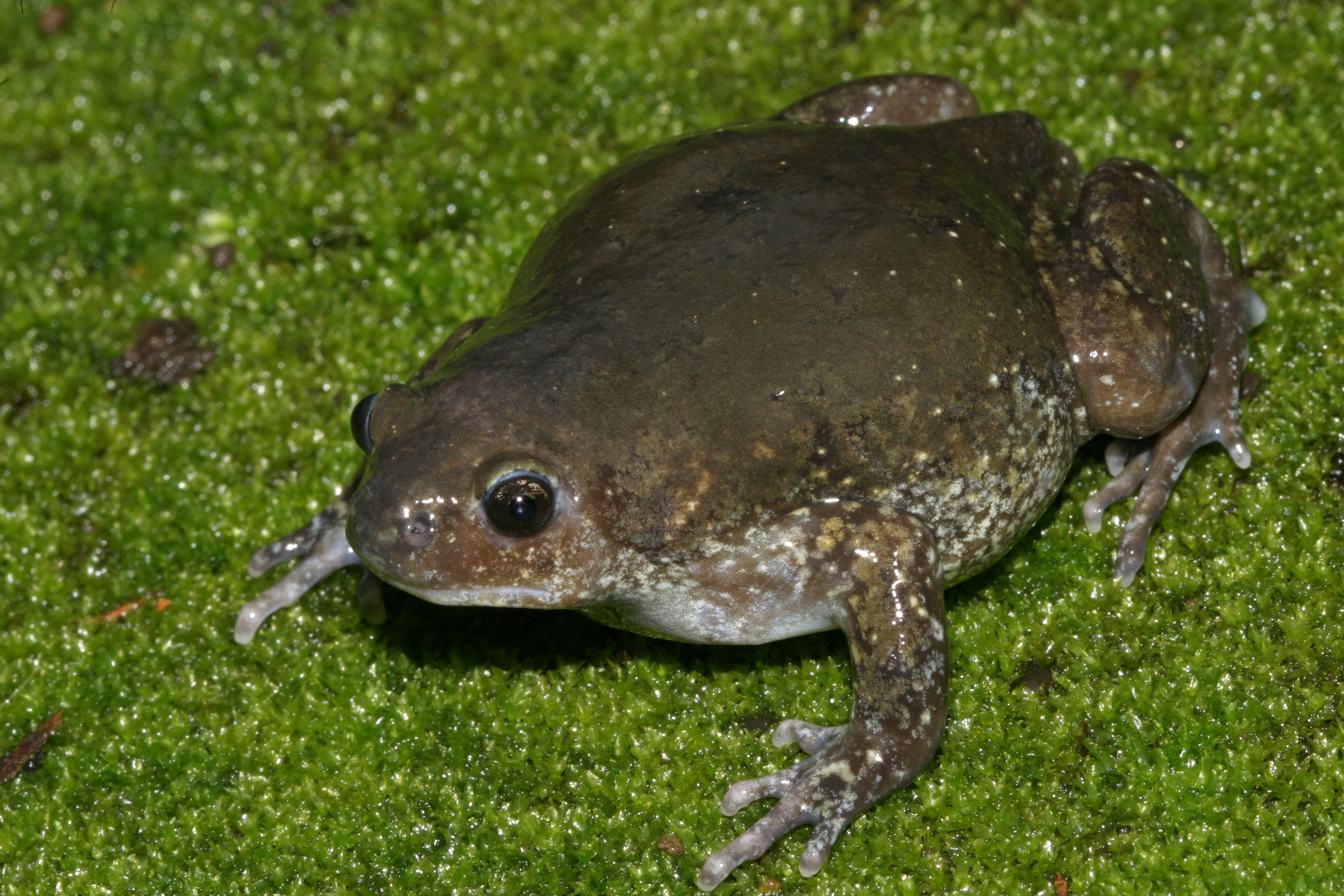
Lateral view

Uperodon globulosus is very stout in appearance, even more so than its close relative Uperodon systoma. They grow up to 76 mm (3 in) in snout–vent length.

== Description ==
The adult male frog is 65 mm in snout-vent length and the adult female frog is 85 mm. The skin of the dorsum is gray-brown in color and the belly is white in color. During the breeding season, the frog's throat becomes yellow with black spots. This frog uses its short and sturdy back legs to burrow.

== Habitat ==
It is a fossorial species that is found in both scrub forests and agricultural land. Scientists have seen it as high as 1200 meters above sea level.

This frog lives in many protected parks, for example Vansda National Park, Nagarjunasagar Srisailam Tiger Reserve, Tadoba Andhari Tiger Reserve, Dudhwa National Park, Radhanagari Wildlife Sanctuary, Phansad Wildlife Sanctuary, Shuklaphanta National Park, Bardia National Park, and Royal Manas National Park.

== Reproduction ==
This frog breeds explosively in shallow ponds.

The tadpole's back is brown in color. The tail is whitish in color with darker stripes. The flanks and ventral areas have dark spots.

== Threats ==
The IUCN classifies this frog is not in danger of dying out. Pollution from farms, roads, and urban areas can harm this frog directly. It is also often struck as roadkill. Climate change could kill this frog by changing the monsoon rains that produce the frog's breeding pools.
