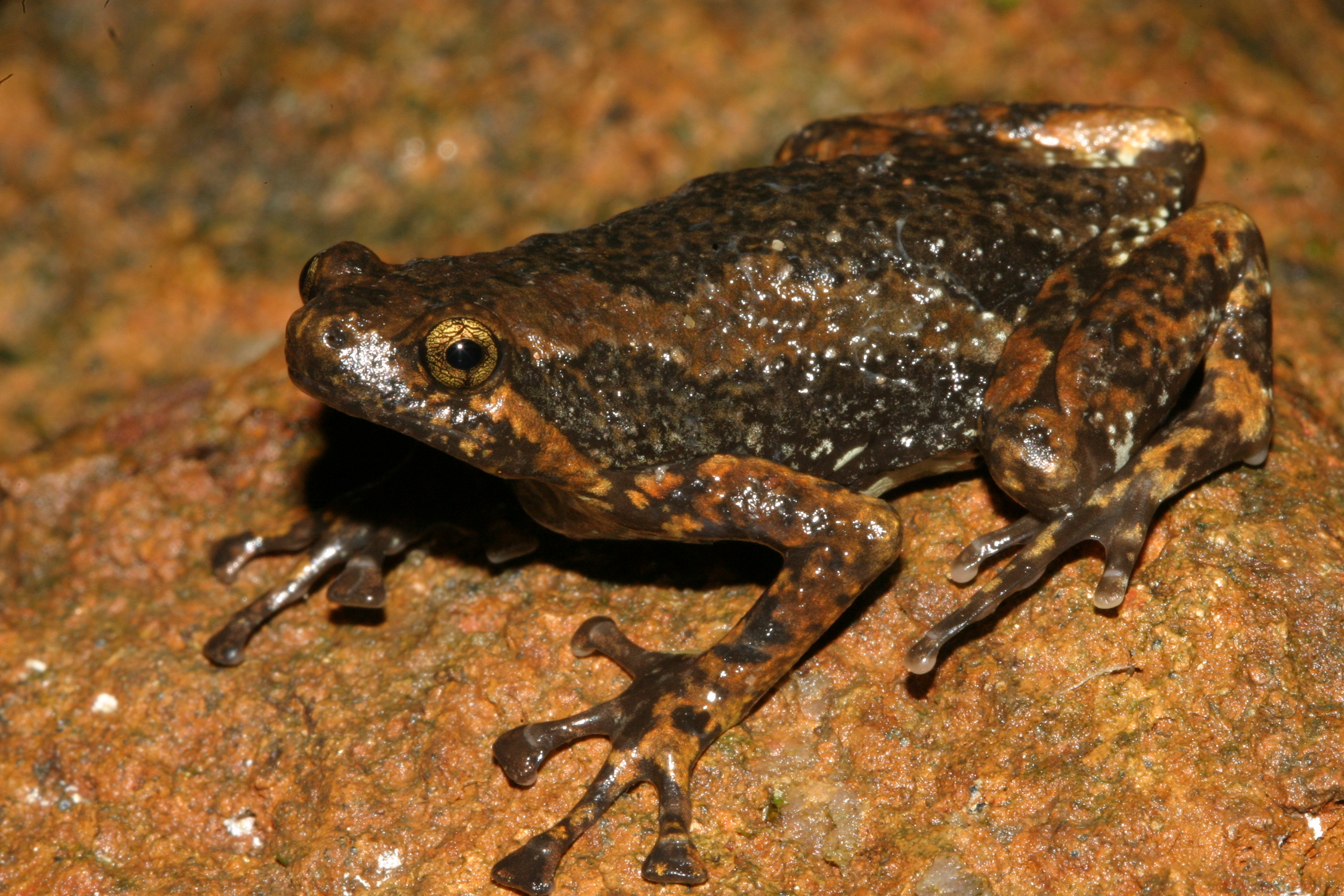

Conservation status
- Least Concern (IUCN 3.1)

Scientific classification
- Kingdom: Animalia
- Phylum: Chordata
- Class: Amphibia
- Order: Anura
- Family: Microhylidae
- Genus: Uperodon
- Species: U. anamalaiensis

Binomial name
- Uperodon anamalaiensis (Rao, 1937)

Synonyms
- Ramanella anamalaiensis Rao, 1937; Ramanella minor Rao, 1937; Uperodon minor (Rao, 1937)

= Uperodon anamalaiensis =

Species of amphibian

Uperodon anamalaiensis, also known as Anamalai dot frog, Anamalai ramanella, or reddish-brown microhylid frog, is a species of narrow-mouthed frog (family Microhylidae) found in South India. The holotype was discovered at the base of the Anaimalai Hills, Coimbatore district in the southern Western Ghats. The holotype is missing and the status of the species was uncertain till 2010. Until rediscovered in the Parambikulam Wildlife Sanctuary in 2010, this frog was reported only once by C. R. Narayan Rao in 1937.

== Description ==
Multiple populations of this species were located by S.P. Vijayakumar, Anil Zachariah, David Raju, Sachin Rai and S.D. Biju in different habitats within Parambikulam Tiger Reserve in Kerala and Tamil Nadu. This frog exhibits a light to dark-brown dorsum with two yellow lines and scattered yellow spots. The underside of the body is brown with scattered white spots, giving it the common name 'Anamalai dot frog'. This frog calls loudly during the monsoon season. It hides under stones and logs on the forest floor or within tree holes during the rest of the year.

== External sources ==
- Photos of Ramanella anamalaiensis
- Rediscovery of five lost frogs from India (manuscript in preparation)
