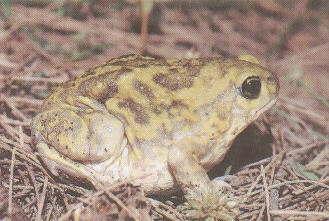
- Uperodon systoma

Scientific classification
- Domain: Eukaryota
- Kingdom: Animalia
- Phylum: Chordata
- Class: Amphibia
- Order: Anura
- Family: Microhylidae
- Subfamily: Microhylinae
- Genus: Uperodon; Duméril & Bibron, 1841

Species
- 12 species (see text)

Synonyms
- Hyperodon Agassiz, 1846; Cacopus Günther, 1864; Pachybatrachus Keferstein, 1868; Ramanella Rao and Ramanna, 1925

= Uperodon =

Genus of amphibians

Uperodon is a genus of microhylid frogs. They occur in South Asia (Pakistan, India, Sri Lanka, Bhutan, Nepal, and Bangladesh) and Myanmar. Uperodon reached its current composition in 2016 when the genus Ramanella was brought into its synonymy. The common names of these frogs are globular frogs and balloon frogs in reference to their stout appearance, or dot frogs, the last specifically referring to the former Ramanella.

Uperodon includes burrowing frogs that eat ants and termites.

== Species ==
There are 12 recognized species:

- Uperodon anamalaiensis (Rao, 1937)
- Uperodon globulosus (Günther, 1864)
- Uperodon montanus (Jerdon, 1853)
- Uperodon mormoratus (Rao, 1937)
- Uperodon nagaoi (Manamendra-Arachchi and Pethiyagoda, 2001)
- Uperodon obscurus (Günther, 1864)
- Uperodon palmatus (Parker, 1934)
- Uperodon rohani Garg, Senevirathne, Wijayathilaka, Phuge, Deuti, Manamendra-Arachchi, Meegaskumbura, and Biju, 2018
- Uperodon systoma (Schneider, 1799)
- Uperodon taprobanicus (Parker, 1934)
- Uperodon triangularis (Günther, 1876)
- Uperodon variegatus (Stoliczka, 1872)

The AmphibiaWeb also lists Uperodon minor Rao, 1937, which is considered synonym of Uperodon anamalaiensis by the Amphibian Species of the World.
