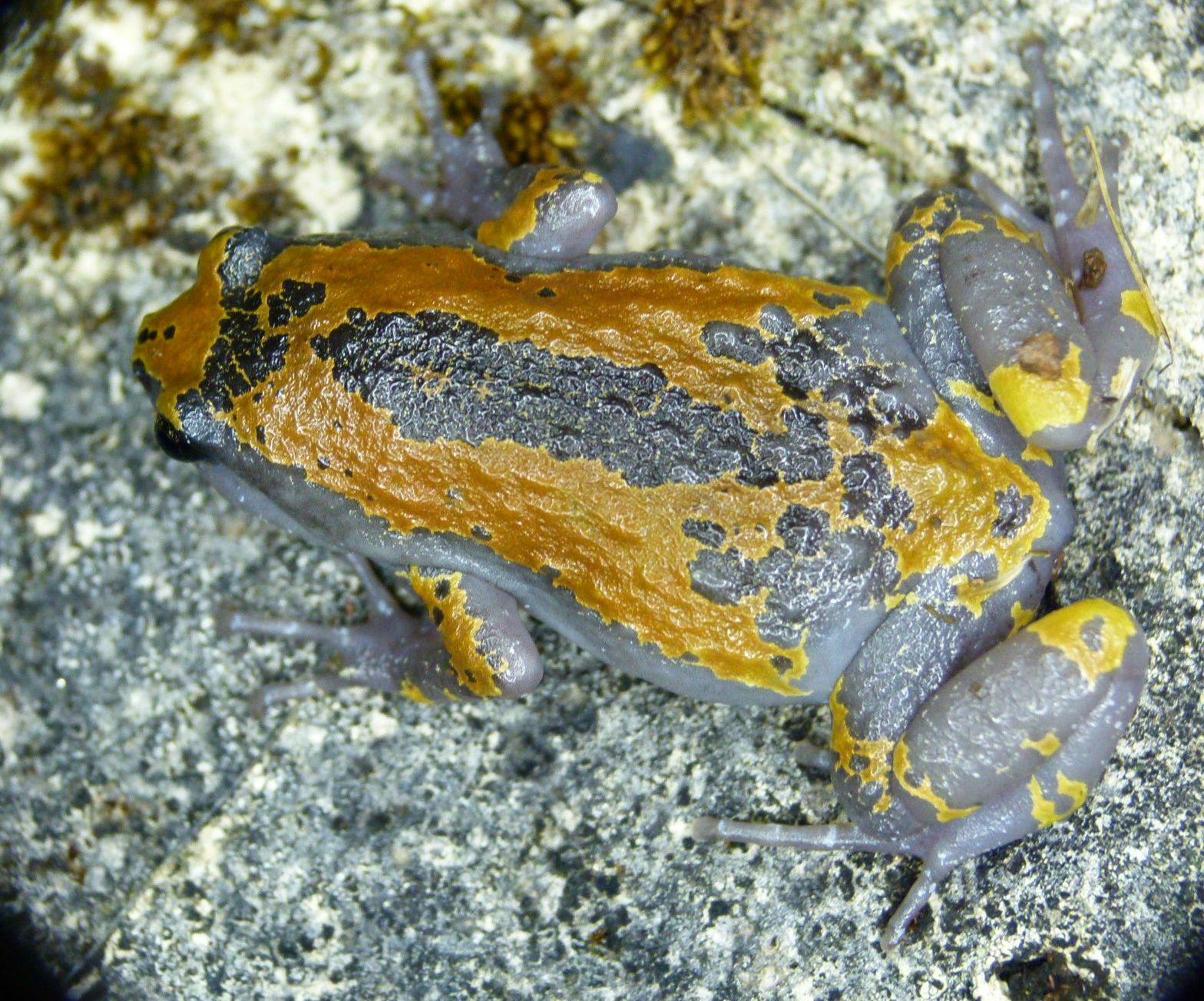

Conservation status
- Vulnerable (IUCN 3.1)

Scientific classification
- Kingdom: Animalia
- Phylum: Chordata
- Class: Amphibia
- Order: Anura
- Family: Microhylidae
- Genus: Uperodon
- Species: U. triangularis

Binomial name
- Uperodon triangularis (Günther, 1876)

Synonyms
- Callula triangularis Günther, 1876 "1875"; Kaloula triangularis (Günther, 1876); Ramanella triangularis (Günther, 1876); Ramanella triangularis rufeventris Rao, 1937

= Uperodon triangularis =

Species of amphibian

Uperodon triangularis is a species of narrow-mouthed frog (family Microhylidae) found in southwestern India. They are endemic to the Western Ghats, where they are known to breed in water collected in tree hollows. The advertisement calls of males is made up of about 30 pulses of 0.38 second duration with a frequency range of 0.6 and 1.1 kHz. These are emitted every three seconds.
