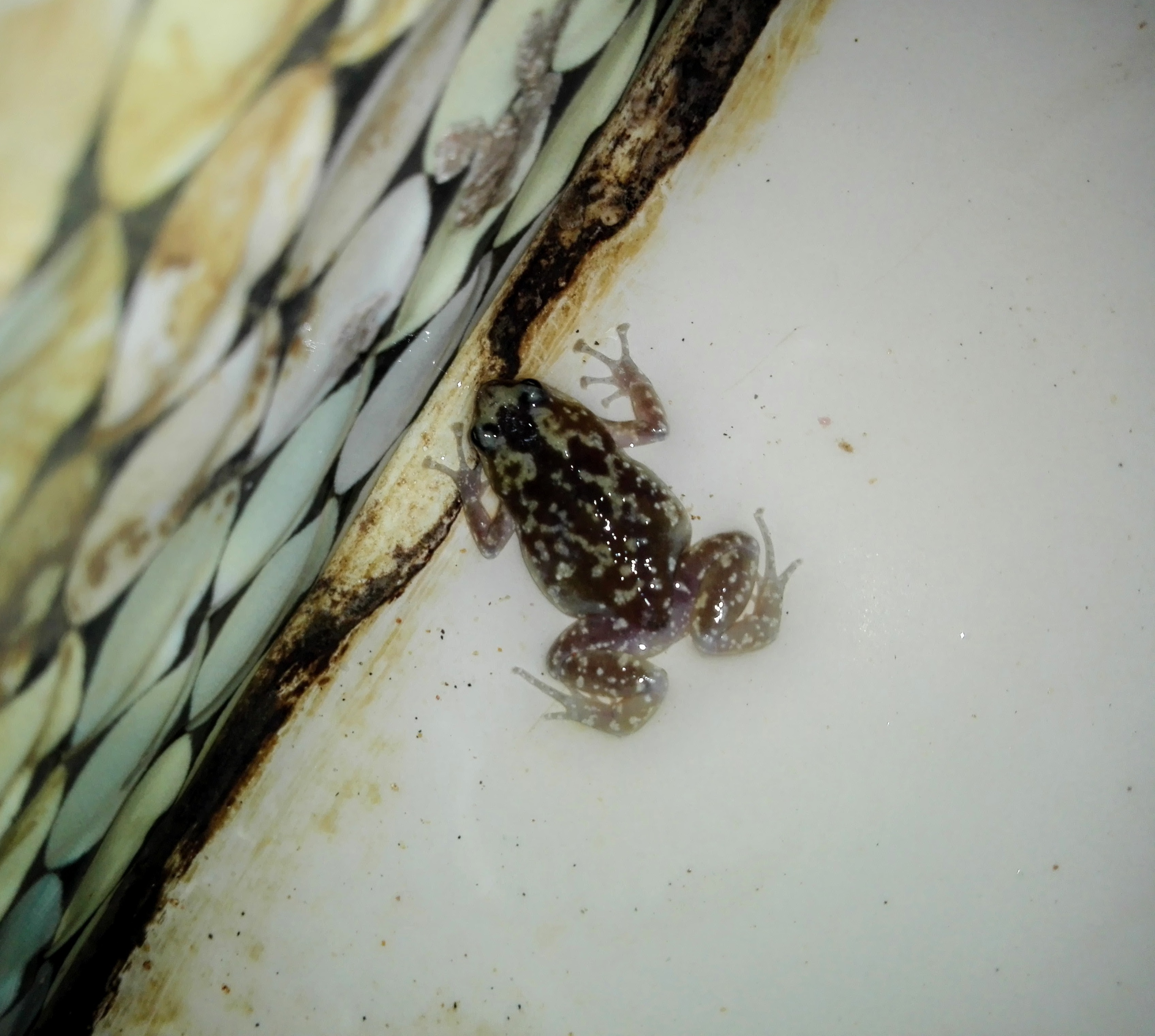
- In a bathroom in Trincomalee, Sri Lanka

Scientific classification
- Kingdom: Animalia
- Phylum: Chordata
- Class: Amphibia
- Order: Anura
- Family: Microhylidae
- Genus: Uperodon
- Species: U. rohani

Binomial name
- Uperodon rohani Garg S, Senevirathne G, Wijayathilaka N, Phuge S, Deuti K, Manamendra-Arachchi K, Meegaskumbura M, Biju SD. 2018
- Range

= Uperodon rohani =

Rohan's globular frog

Species of frog

Uperodon rohani, commonly known as Rohan's globular frog, is a species of Microhylid frog. It is endemic to Sri Lanka.

== Etymology ==
It was named after scientist Rohan Pethiyagoda, known for his works on Sri Lankan fishes and amphibians, among others.

== Taxonomy ==
It was previously considered conspecific with Uperodon variegatus, but was separated in 2018. The genetic difference between them is large, around 2.8%.

== Description ==
It is a small frog, typically around 26–34 millimetres (2.6–3.4 cm) long in males and 28–35 millimetres (2.8–3.5 cm) in females. It is maroon with slightly pale olive yellow spots, blotches and streaks. Near its belly and thigh there are densely packed olive speckles. It has a partially translucent foot and ankle.

== Distribution ==
It is found throughout Sri Lanka, but is most abundant in the lowlands.

== Habitat ==
It is found in wet environments, such as ponds and puddles. It regularly interacts with humans, being common in water bodies and reservoirs, agricultural land such as paddyfields, and moist locations within houses and buildings, such as bathrooms.
