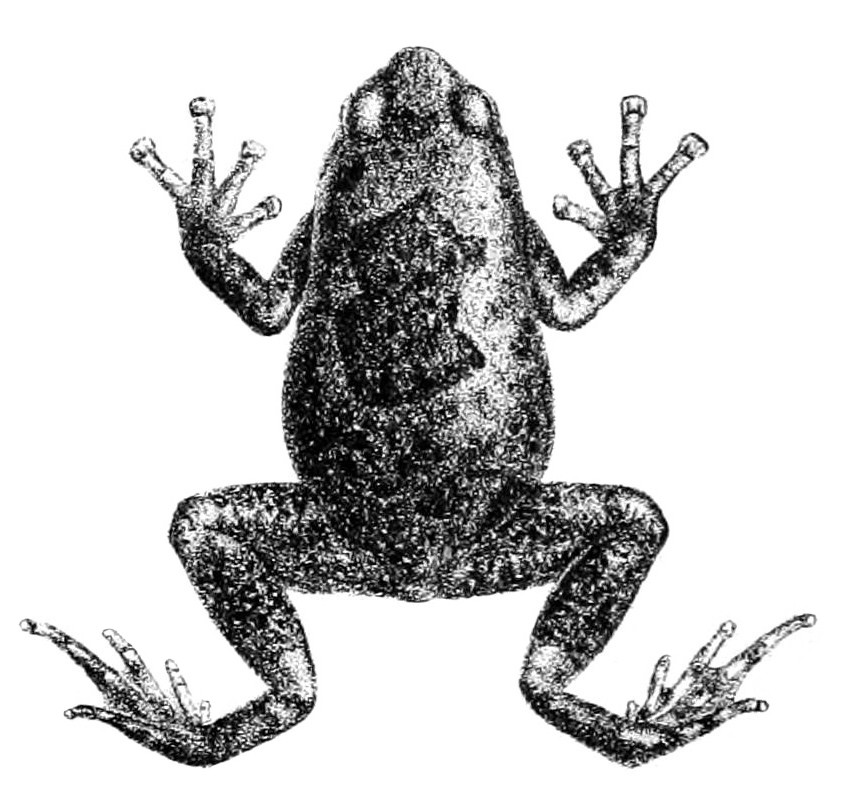

Conservation status
- Near Threatened (IUCN 3.1)

Scientific classification
- Kingdom: Animalia
- Phylum: Chordata
- Class: Amphibia
- Order: Anura
- Family: Microhylidae
- Genus: Uperodon
- Species: U. obscurus

Binomial name
- Uperodon obscurus (Günther, 1864)

Synonyms
- Callula obscura Günther, 1864; Ramanella obscura (Günther, 1864)

= Uperodon obscurus =

Species of frog

Uperodon obscurus is a species of frog in the family Microhylidae. It is endemic to Sri Lanka. Its natural habitats are subtropical or tropical moist lowland forests, subtropical or tropical moist montane forests, freshwater marshes, intermittent freshwater marshes, rural gardens, and heavily degraded former forest.
