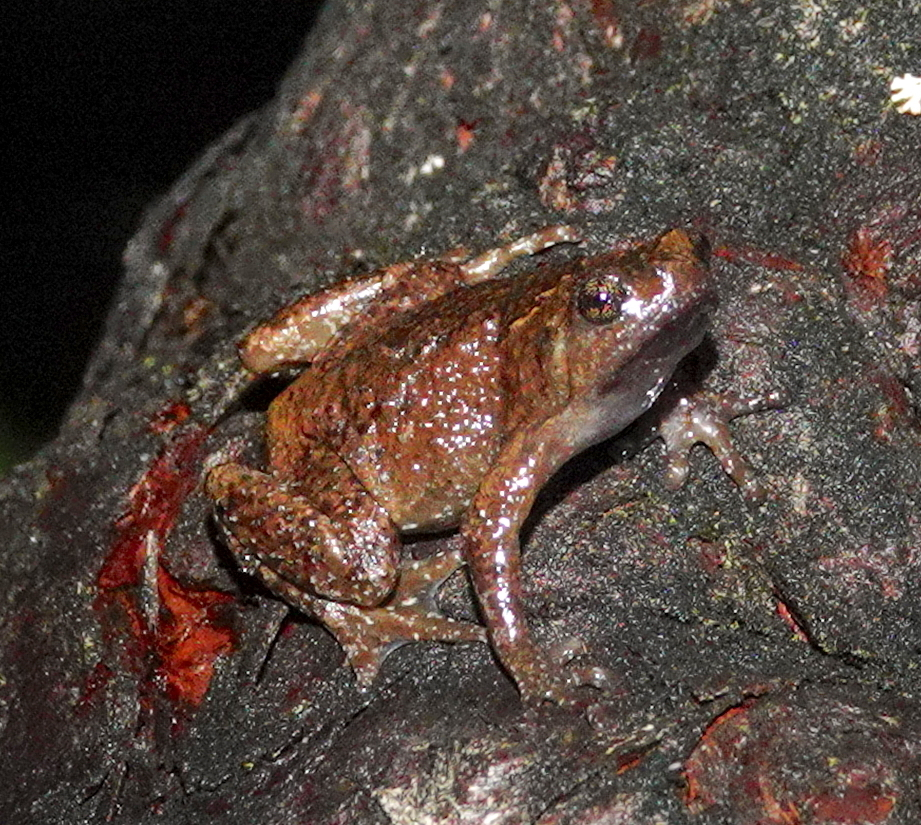

Conservation status
- Endangered (IUCN 3.1)

Scientific classification
- Kingdom: Animalia
- Phylum: Chordata
- Class: Amphibia
- Order: Anura
- Family: Microhylidae
- Genus: Uperodon
- Species: U. palmatus

Binomial name
- Uperodon palmatus (Parker, 1934)

Synonyms
- Ramanella palmata Parker, 1934

= Uperodon palmatus =

Species of frog

Uperodon palmatus is a species of frog in the family Microhylidae. It is endemic to the central hills of Sri Lanka. Common names Parker's dot frog, Parker's globular frog, and half-webbed pug-snout frog have been coined for it.

Uperodon palmatus inhabits montane tropical moist forest habitats at elevations of 1,830–2,135 m (6,004–7,005 ft) above sea level. Adults occur in leaf-litter (at least partially fossorially), under stones and other ground cover, beneath bark, on the trunks of trees, and in the canopy. It is a rare species. It is threatened by habitat loss caused by the conversion of forests used to cultivate land (tea plantations), logging, and droughts and fire (especially in the Horton Plains National Park). It occurs in a number of protected areas.
