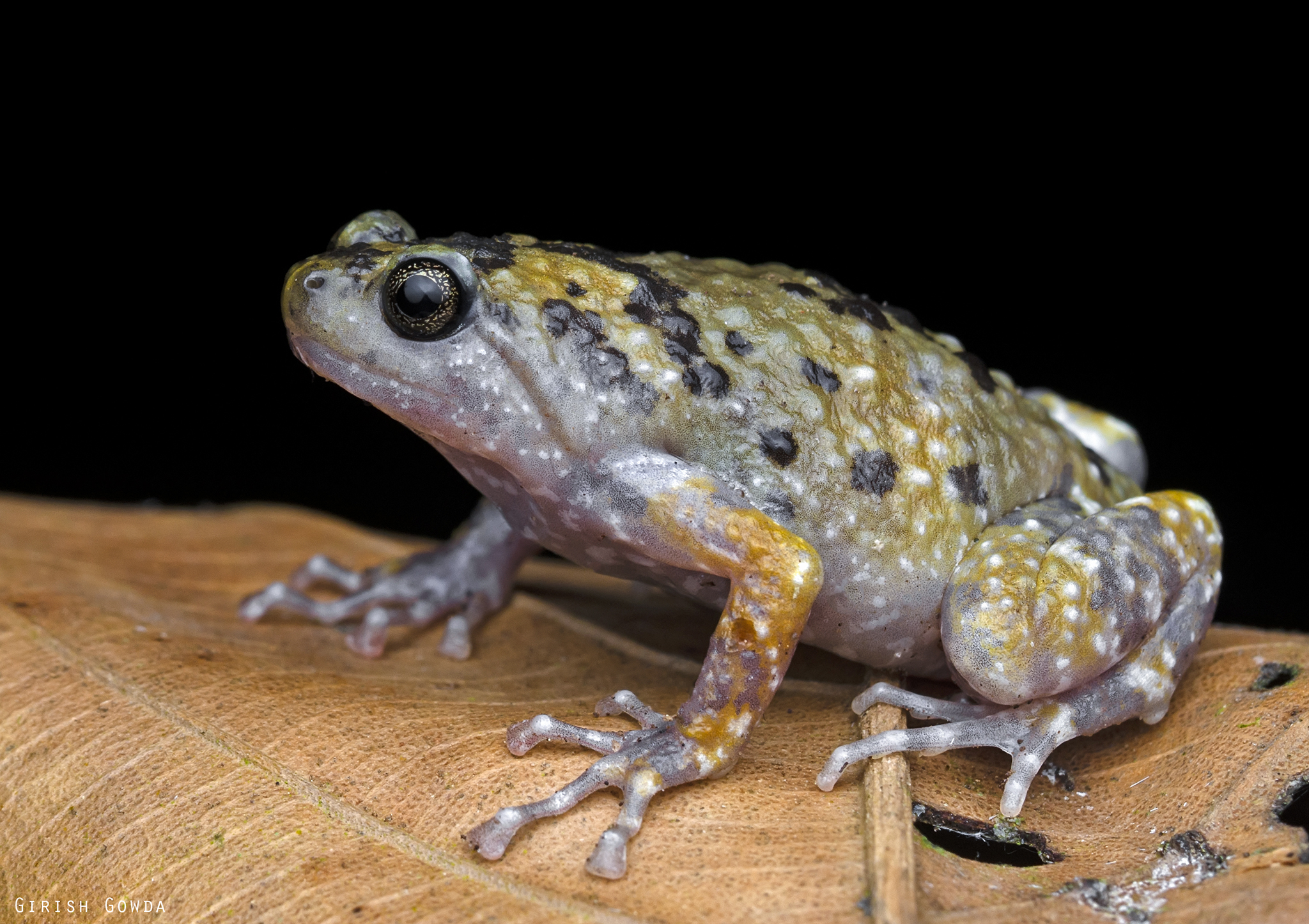

Conservation status
- Endangered (IUCN 3.1)

Scientific classification
- Kingdom: Animalia
- Phylum: Chordata
- Class: Amphibia
- Order: Anura
- Family: Microhylidae
- Genus: Uperodon
- Species: U. mormoratus

Binomial name
- Uperodon mormoratus (Rao, 1937)

Synonyms
- Ramanella mormorata Rao, 1937

= Uperodon mormoratus =

Species of amphibian

Uperodon mormoratus, also known as the Indian dot frog, marbled ramanella, dark-banded frog, and mottled globular frog, is a species of narrow-mouthed frog endemic to the Western Ghats of southwestern India. It was previously placed in the genus Ramanella. It has only been reported from three locations, though locally found in some numbers.
