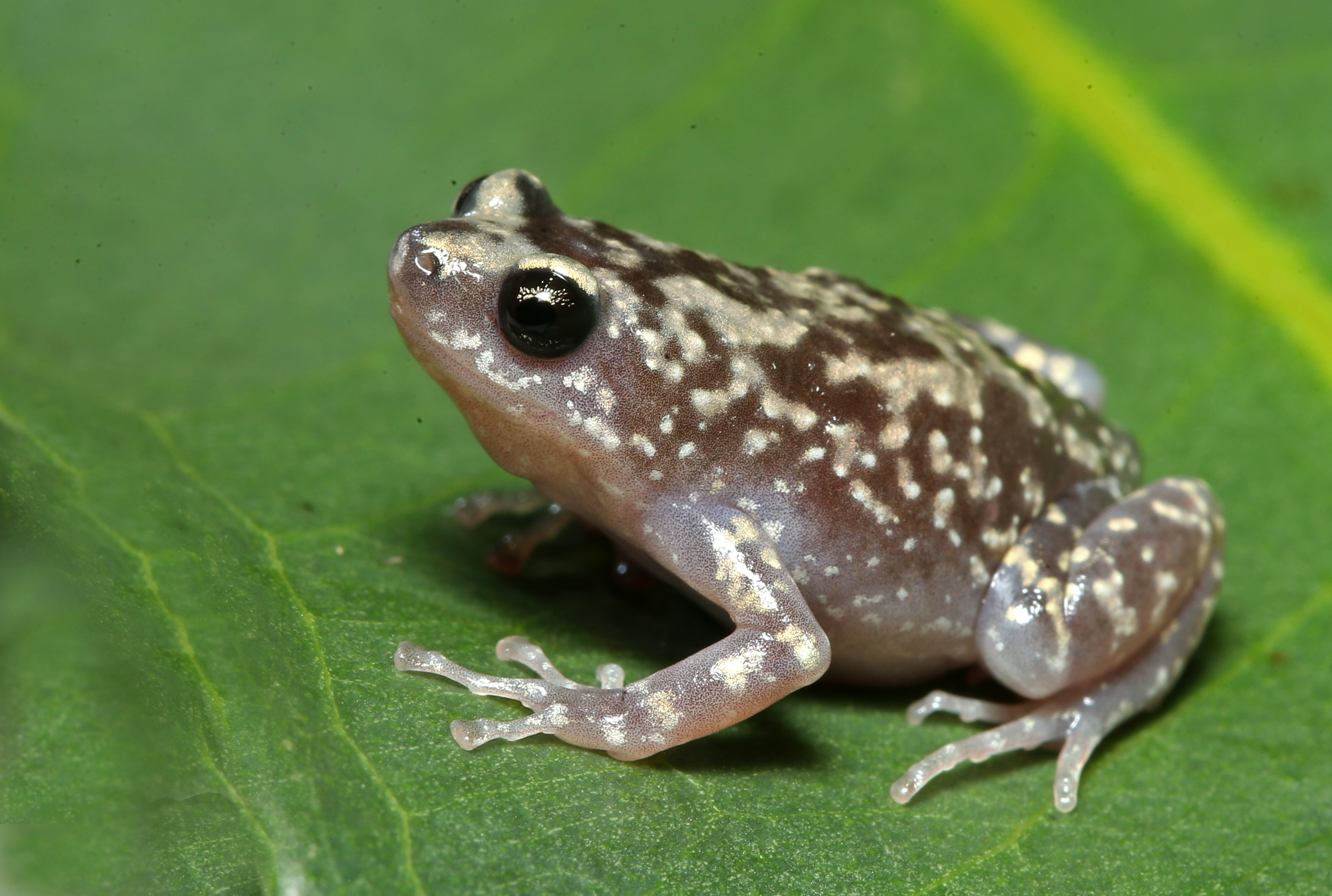

Conservation status
- Least Concern (IUCN 3.1)

Scientific classification
- Kingdom: Animalia
- Phylum: Chordata
- Class: Amphibia
- Order: Anura
- Family: Microhylidae
- Genus: Uperodon
- Species: U. variegatus

Binomial name
- Uperodon variegatus (Stoliczka, 1872)

Synonyms
- Hylaedactylus carnaticus Jerdon, 1853 – nomen nudum; Callula variegata Stoliczka, 1872; Callula olivacea Günther, 1876 "1875"; Kaloula variegata (Stoliczka, 1872); Ramanella symbioitica Rao and Ramanna, 1925

= Uperodon variegatus =

Species of amphibian

Uperodon variegatus, also known as the Eluru dot frog, termite nest frog, variable ramanella, variagated ramanella, white-bellied pug snout frog, or variagated globular frog, is a species of narrow-mouthed frog (family Microhylidae) that is endemic to India. Earlier records from Sri Lanka refer to what is now known as Uperodon rohani. They are seen mostly in the monsoon season when they may enter homes. They are small in size and the variegated markings and the genus characteristic of having pads on the fingertips but not on their toes make them easy to identify.

== Description ==
This species is small and often can be found indoors in homes. The discs on the fingers are triangular. Toes have rudimentary webbing with two metatarsal tubercles. The tibio-tarsal joint reaches shoulder when the hind leg is held along the body. They breed during the rainy season (April–October) and call during this time. Males call at night while afloat in water. They have a single subgular vocal sac. The call has been transcribed as ghauy ghauy. The tadpoles are brown or gray with black spots. Sometimes they have a blue spot on each side of the body. The tadpoles are bottom feeders and metamorphose within a month.

== Habitat ==
They breed in water in dark cavities and are often found in termite mounds or under stones. Recorded mainly from peninsular India including the dry zone being found even in Madras and West Bengal. They have been found to be quite tolerant to water salinity.

They have been found to occur with large black scorpions Heterometrus sp. and when disturbed they crawl over the scorpions but flattened and froze when the scorpions walked over them. They can burrow in soft soil.

== Threats ==
This frog is classified as least concern. It has a large range that includes many protected parks, a large population, and a reasonable tolerance to human-induced changes to its environment. Habitat loss and pollution in the form of fertilizers and pesticides pose some risk, and climate change may pose a risk in the future by altering sea levels and removing habitat.

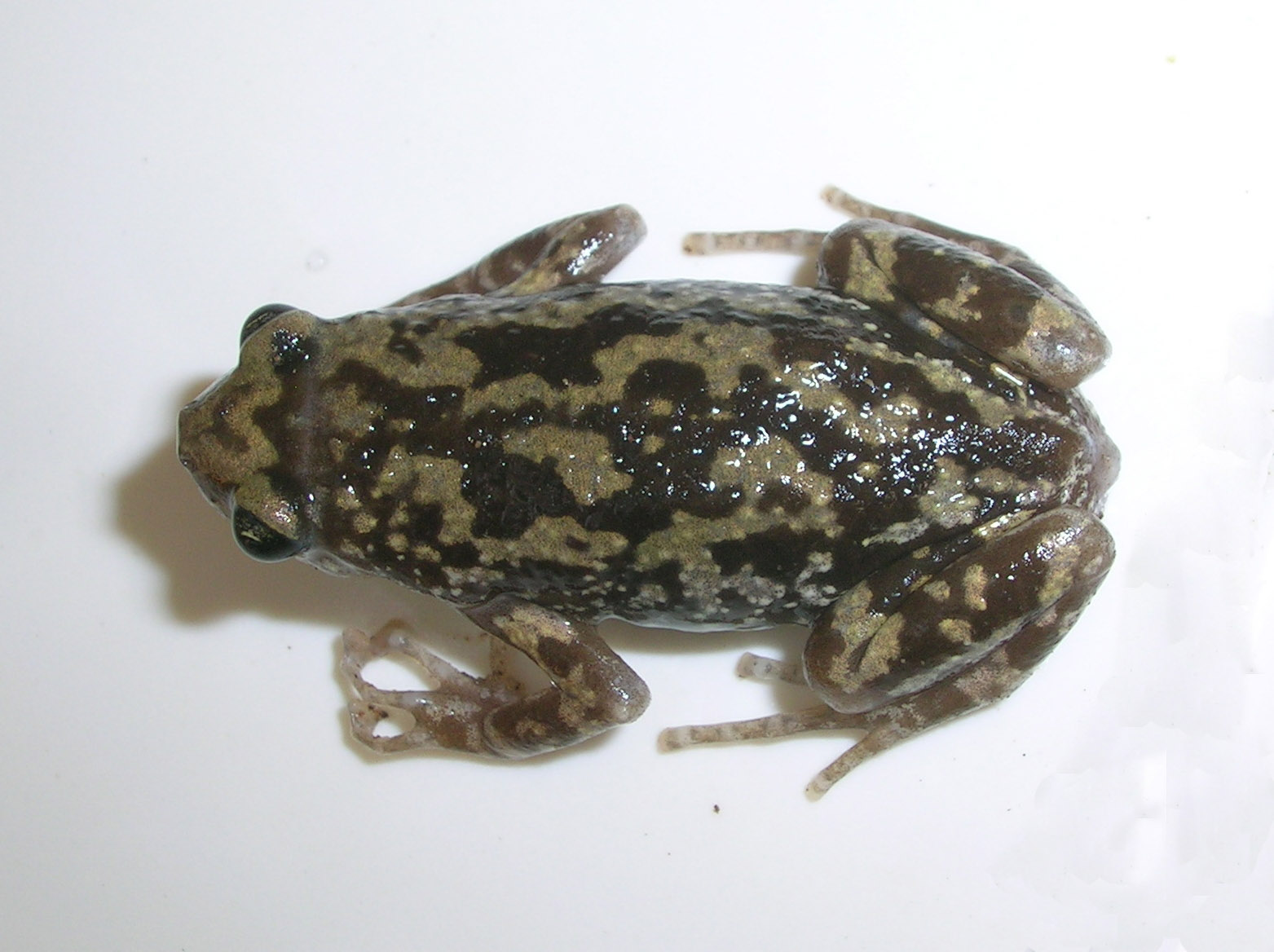

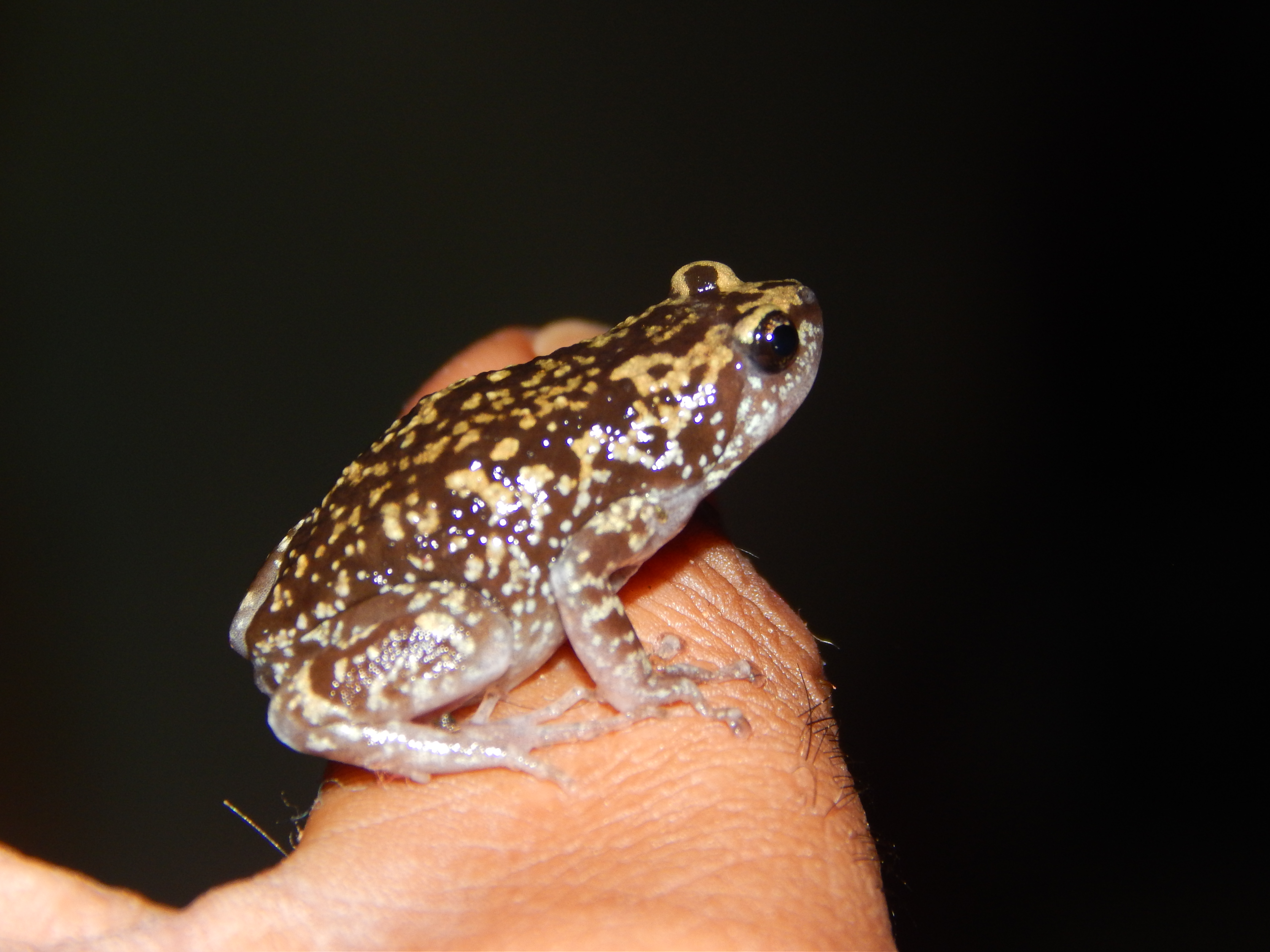
