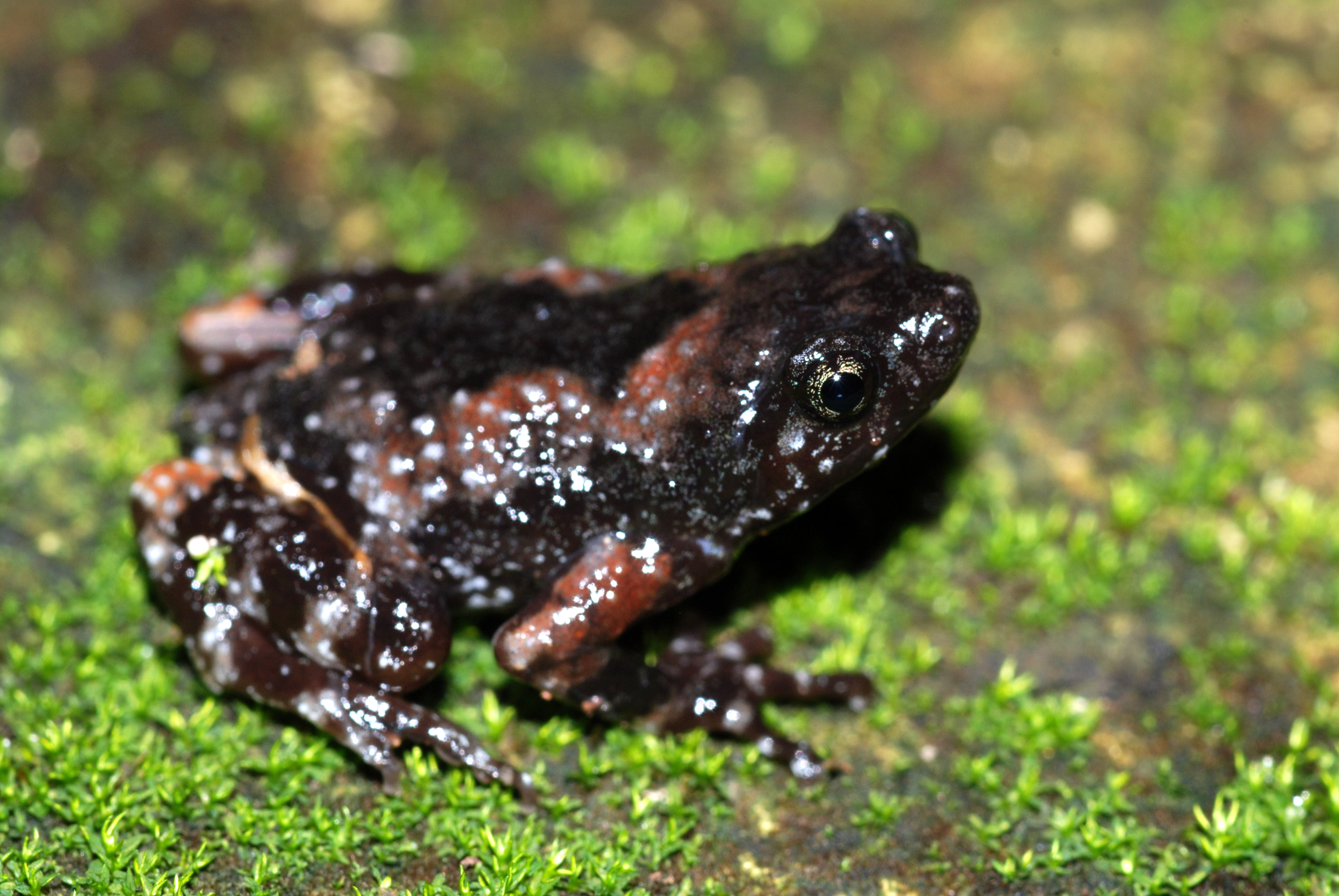

Conservation status
- Near Threatened (IUCN 3.1)

Scientific classification
- Kingdom: Animalia
- Phylum: Chordata
- Class: Amphibia
- Order: Anura
- Family: Microhylidae
- Genus: Uperodon
- Species: U. montanus

Binomial name
- Uperodon montanus (Jerdon, 1859)

Synonyms
- Hylaedactylus montanus Jerdon, 1853; Ramanella montana (Jerdon, 1853)

= Uperodon montanus =

Species of amphibian

Uperodon montanus, also known as Jerdon's narrow-mouthed frog, Jerdon's ramanella, mountain dot frog, mountain globular frog, or Malabar Hill frog, is a species of narrow-mouthed frog (family Microhylidae) endemic to the Western Ghats of India.

== Description ==
The frogs of the (former) genus Ramanella are small and characteristically have discs on their fingers but lack them on the toes. The toes have some webbing. The typical habitat in which this frog is found are tree holes in the rainy season in moist deciduous forest to evergreen forest. They have smooth but bumpy skin. The upper side is brown with dark spots. The snout–vent length is 34–36mm. Males have a single subgular vocal sac that is expanded to a sphere when they call. They call after heavy rains during June or July. They begin calling after sunset and continue all night while the males float on water in small ponds. Females approach calling males and they display axillary amplexus during mating. They aestivate in summer.

== Distribution ==
The distribution of this frog is not fully known but is found in most of the Western Ghats from the Dangs to southern Kerala. This species is found in Moist deciduous forest, Semi-evergreen forest and Evergreen forest. Rain-water filled tree holes are the favoured microhabitat of these frogs.

The egg masses of most Indian microhylids float on the water but those of Uperodon montanus are attached to the tree trunk just above water level or placed on the surface of a floating leaf.

The calls sounds like brong ... brong... brong and the calling is prolonged but stops when disturbed. The amplexus of the pair is in water with the male holding the female behind at her armpit (axillary amplexus).
