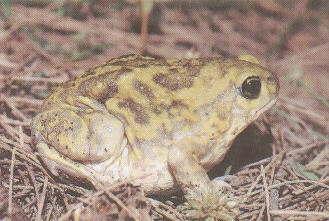

Conservation status
- Least Concern (IUCN 3.1)

Scientific classification
- Kingdom: Animalia
- Phylum: Chordata
- Class: Amphibia
- Order: Anura
- Family: Microhylidae
- Genus: Uperodon
- Species: U. systoma

Binomial name
- Uperodon systoma (Schneider, 1799)

Synonyms
- Rana systoma Schneider, 1799; Cacopus systoma (Schneider, 1799)

= Uperodon systoma =

Species of amphibian

Uperodon systoma is a species of narrow-mouthed frog found in Pakistan, India, Nepal, and Sri Lanka. It is known under many different common names: indistinct frog, marbled balloon frog, and lesser balloon frog.

== Description ==
As the common names suggest, Uperodon systoma have a very stout appearance with a relatively small head. They grow up to 64 mm (2.5 in) in snout–vent length.

Uperodon systoma lack teeth. This unusual feature is probably related to their diet that (after metamorphosis) consists mainly of termites and ants, with other insects appearing in smaller numbers. It is suggested that in capturing such small but spatially clustered prey items teeth would not be very useful; instead, the prey are gathered using their tongue.

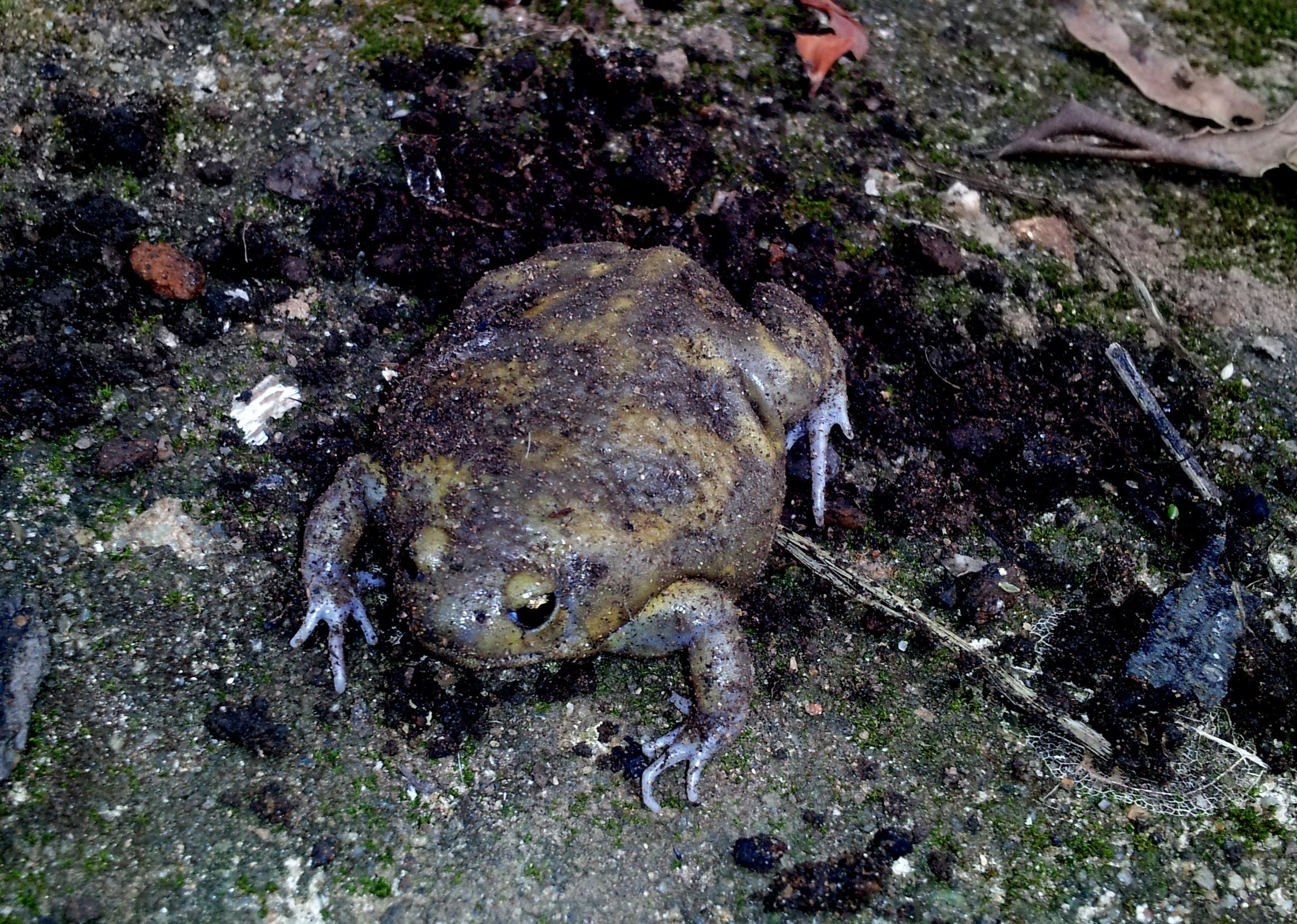
Balloon frog in Bakamuna, Sri Lanka.

== Habitat and behaviour ==
Uperodon systoma is a fossorial species that buries itself in soil. These frogs have been observed in a number of habitats, such as dry forests, plains, gardens, and agricultural areas. Adults are only seen during the summer monsoons; otherwise they retreat into the soil. Feeding may be concentrated to rainy nights during the monsoon when termites emerge to swarm.

Breeding takes place during the monsoon rains when the males call from the banks of streams and paddy fields. Eggs are laid in water where they float.
