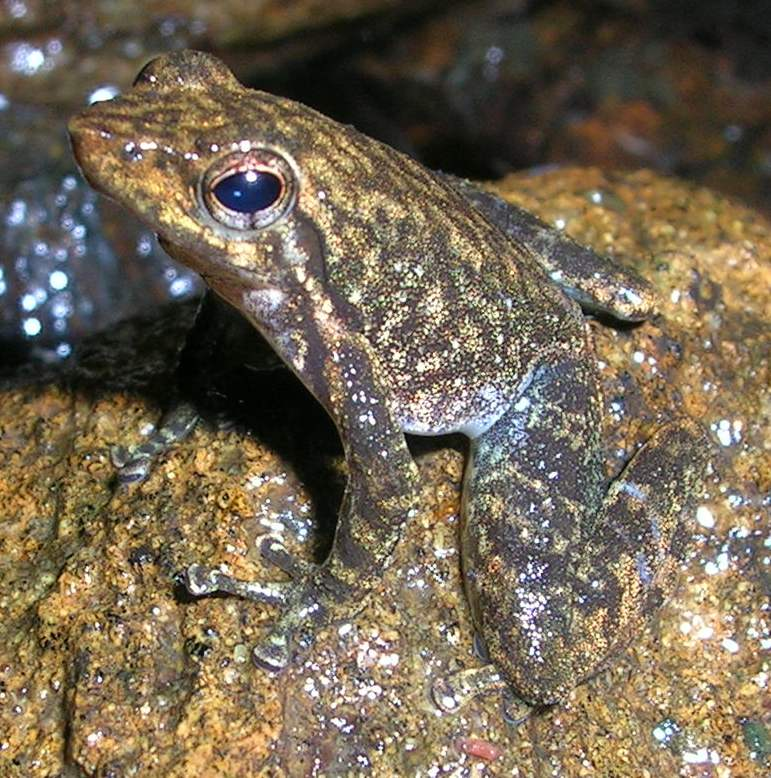

Conservation status
- Vulnerable (IUCN 3.1)

Scientific classification
- Kingdom: Animalia
- Phylum: Chordata
- Class: Amphibia
- Order: Anura
- Family: Micrixalidae
- Genus: Micrixalus
- Species: M. saxicola

Binomial name
- Micrixalus saxicola (Jerdon, 1854)

Synonyms
- Polypedates saxicola Jerdon, 1853; Ixalus saxicola (Jerdon, 1853)

= Micrixalus saxicola =

Species of amphibian

Micrixalus saxicola (black torrent frog, Malabar tropical frog, Jerdon's olive-brown frog, or small torrent frog) is a species of frog in the family Micrixalidae, found in forest streams in the Western Ghats of India. This frog has a brown colored dorsum and a white ventral side with irregular white specks on its dark brown throat and chest. Its smooth skin and cryptic coloration allow it to blend into its surroundings while resting or calling. The males of the species are territorial, and will use calling, foot tapping, and foot flagging to warn off competition.M. saxicolais is described by the IUCN as a vulnerable species due to habitat loss, fragmentation, and human interference. The frog also threatened by infection by the fungus Batrachochytrium dendrobatidis.

== Description ==
=== Adult ===
M. saxicola is a small frog that is about 25 to 30 mm or 1 to 1 in, long from snout to vent. Males have an average snout to vent length of 24.21 mm (0.953 in), while females are larger with an average snout to vent length of 32.44 mm (1.277 in), though some individuals have been reported to grow as long as 40 mm (1.6 in). It typically has a brown dorsum, although some individuals with medium dark yellow dorsal coloration have been observed. The ventral side is white, and its throat and chest are dark, dusky brown with irregular white specks. M. saxicola has smooth skin, and its cryptic coloration can help it blend into the background of its surroundings when it is resting or calling on the surface of rocks. The species has a pointed snout which extends past its mouth, oval-shaped nostrils close to its eyes, a small but visible tympanum, and hind limbs that have light gray webbing with small black spots. While the hind limbs are fully webbed, the fingers are not. Instead, the tips of its fingers and toes dilate out into large discs that meet the light gray hind limb webbing, and it has small subarticular tubercles and a small inner metatarsal tubercle. Males have nuptial pads on their first finger, while most members of this species have weakly developed prepollexes, or pseudo thumbs. M. saxicola also has a cleft tongue with lingual papillae along the median line. Its vocal sac is bright white, which plays an important role in signal discrimination and agonistic interactions between males.

This species can be distinguished from similar and closely related frogs, such as Micrixalus kottigeharensis and Micrixalus specca, by the equal lengths of its thigh and shank, fully webbed toes, lingual papillae on the median line of its tongue, the lack of dorsolateral falls, and the size difference between males and females.

=== Tadpole ===
Tadpoles only have one row of labial teeth. While other information about M. saxicola young remains limited, there have been studies examining the tadpoles of other frogs in the Micrixalidae family. It is thought that tadpoles of this species are partly fossorial because females lay eggs in small depressions they dig in the sand underwater. Tadpoles of other Micrixalus frogs have been described as "eel-like," with muscular bodies and tails and poorly developed eyes early in development.

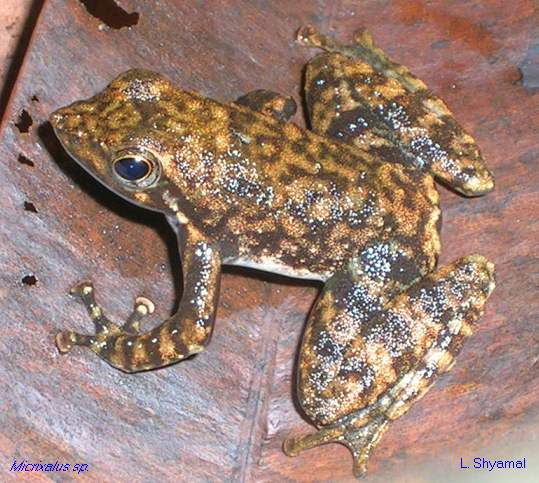

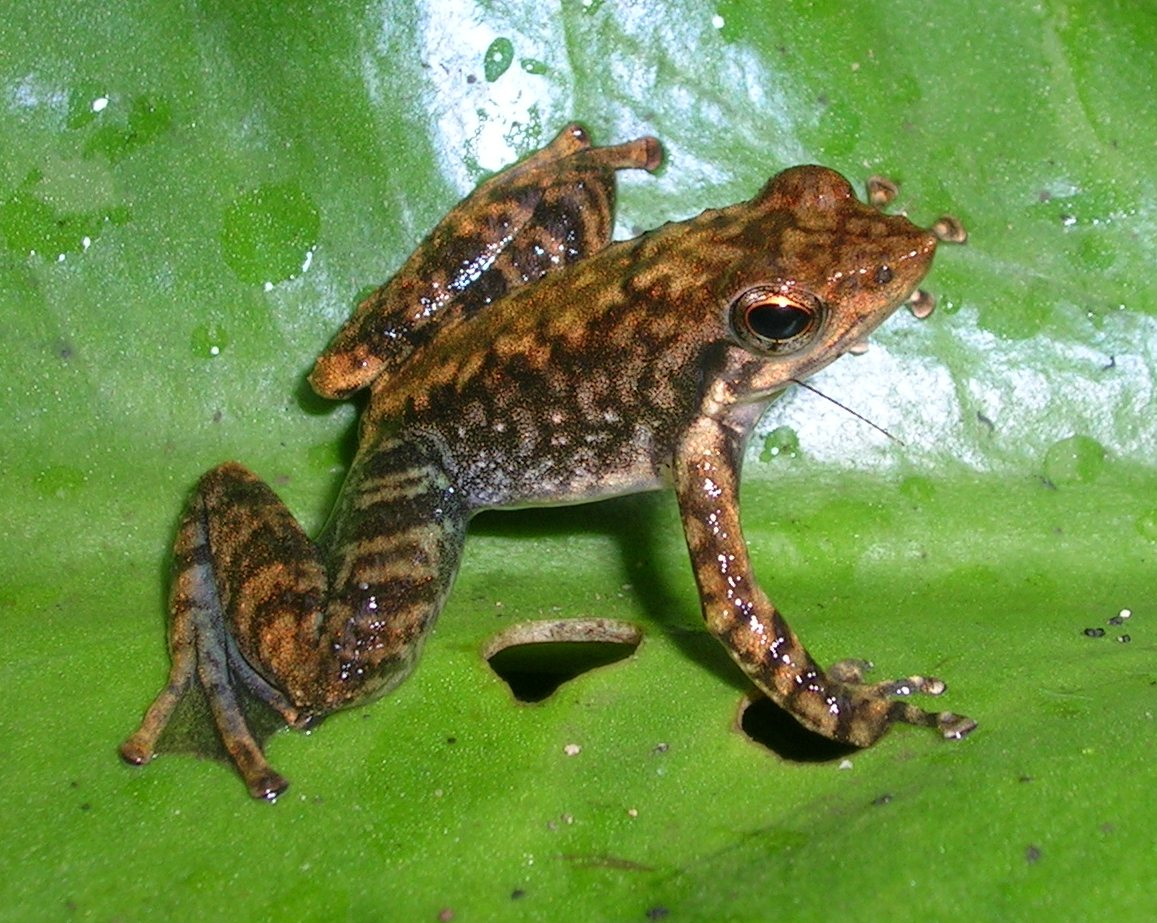

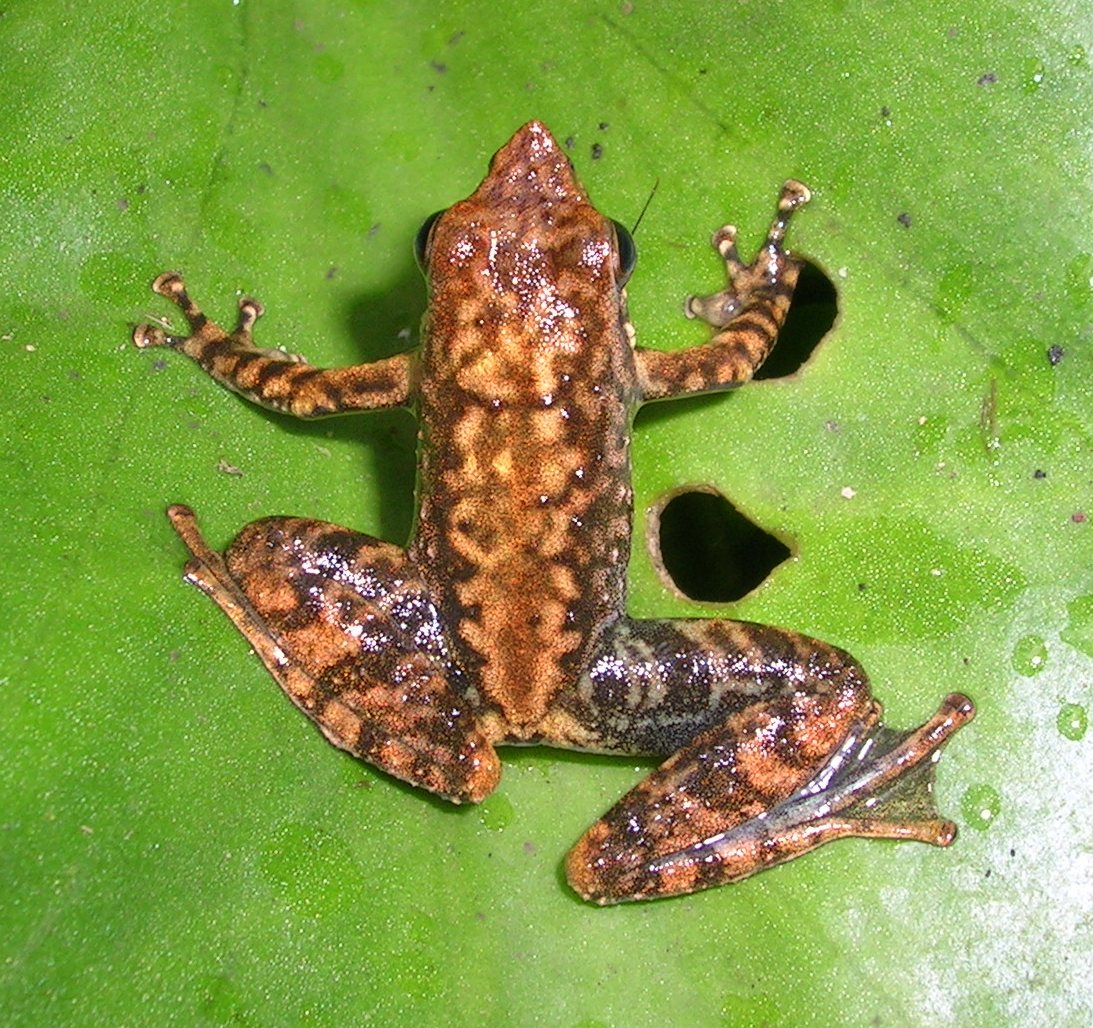

== Habitat and distribution ==
M. saxicola is endemic to the Western Ghats mountain range in India, specifically within the south Indian states of Kerala and Karnataka. Reports indicate this frog is typically found at altitudes between 11° and 14°N and at elevations between 400 and 1400 m above mean sea level. Populations of the species are found throughout the Western Ghats, but they are widely separated.

The species inhabits moist semi-evergreen and moist deciduous forests, and can often be found on the rocks along streams and riverbanks in the hills. While M. saxicola is most commonly found near clear torrential streams. Leaf litter on the forest floor may also offer an important place of refuge for frogs during dry seasons. M. saxicola prefers areas with lower air, water, and soil temperatures. Such low air and water temperatures tend to be associated with thicker forest canopy cover as well, indicating this species prefers areas with low penetration of light onto the forest floor. A study conducted in 2001 also showed that M. saxicola tends to favor slightly acidic water and soil that also have high concentrations of dissolved oxygen and low concentrations of carbon dioxide. This species tends to co-occur with the amphibians Nyctibatrachus major, N. aliciae, Rana beddomi, and Rana temporalis.

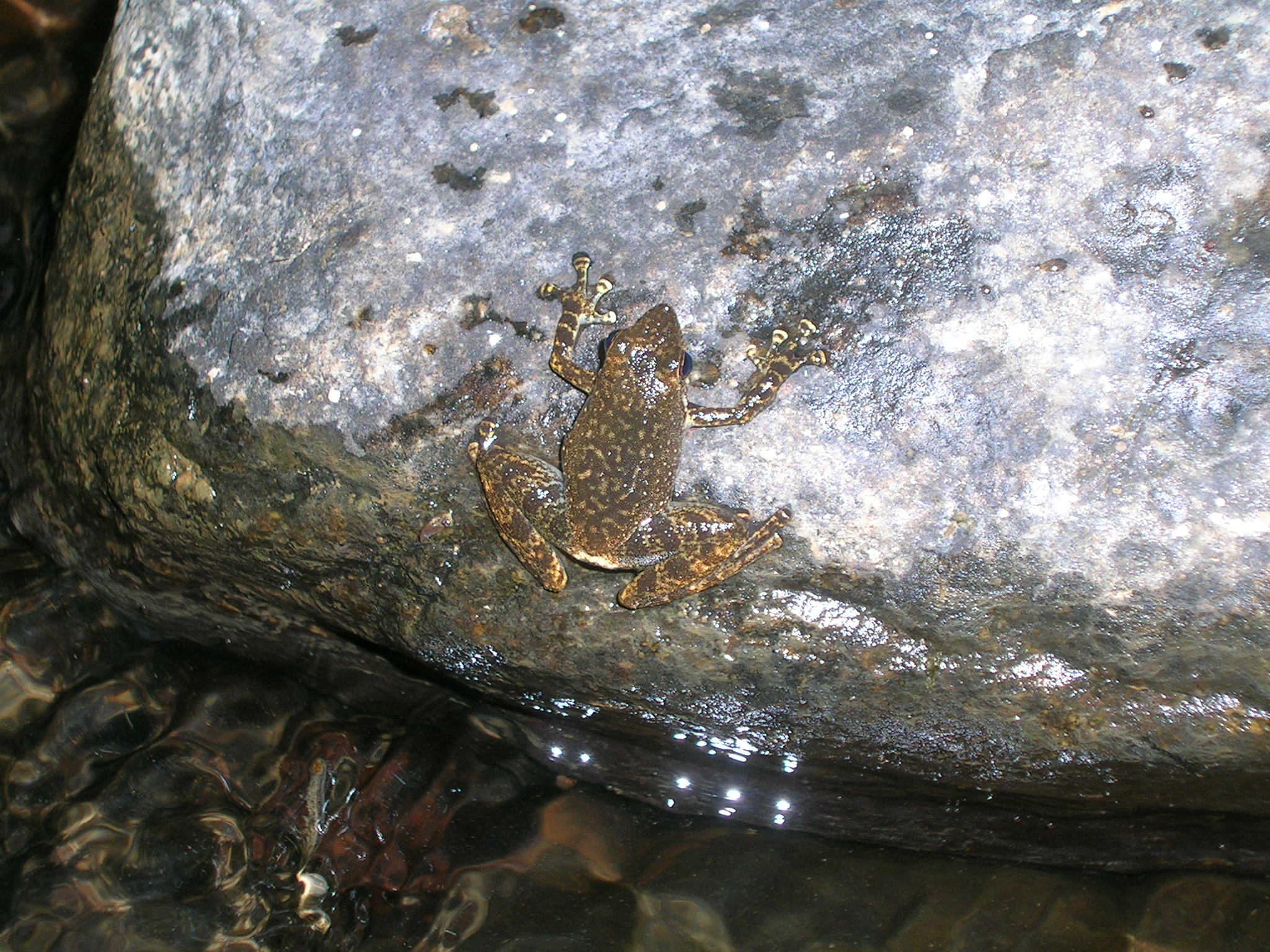
M. saxicola often rests on the flat surfaces of rocks, which they are able to blend into thanks to their brown coloration.

== Behavior ==
M. saxicola is a diurnal species that can often be found attached to flat surfaces of rocks in fast-moving streams. They have also been observed to move away from the torrents during the height of the monsoon season to avoid being swept away by the current. Adults communicate with one another in large social groups.

=== Courtship ===
Males of this species occupy elevated rock perches – about 2 to 8 cm above the water level – near streams and waterfalls to attract females, which they do primarily by calling. This call has been described as sounding like "Chir… chir… chir… chir… ri… ri… ri… ri ri.." and can be heard by humans up to 10 to 14 m away. On average, males call at a rate of 13.25 calls per minute, with the highest calling rates being observed during the breeding season during the monsoon months between July and October. Males call for 3 to 8 minutes in one direction, then rotate 90 to 180 degrees and call in that direction continuously before repeating the process. Longer calls are thought to attract females while also demonstrating a male's ability and willingness to defend his territory. Females do not have any known vocalizations.

M. saxicola's habitats are characterized by high amounts of ambient noise from both the environment and other males' calls, so the species has evolved multimodal stimuli to improve specific communication beyond just the auditory calls. One such mechanism is the natural inflation and deflation of the vocal sac, which recycles air and improves call rate and the distance which the sound travels. The bright white color of the vocal sac also provides a visual stimulus that helps males identify the specific source of a call from other males. It is thought that seeing this vocal sac improves signal detection and reduces interference caused by ambient noise.

=== Territorialism ===
M. saxicola males are territorial and will defend the rocks and perches from which they call. Calling and foot-tapping are some of the methods males employ to warn off their competition. The other primary behavior is "foot-flagging," which involves the male lifting and extending a hindlimb away from its body for 20 to 30 seconds. Foot-flagging is thought to have evolved as an agonistic signal that reduces the rate of physical combat between males, thus lowering the risk of injury in competition over territory and mating opportunities. This is contrary to foot-flagging behavior in Staurois parvus, where foot-flagging is performed as part of its courtship behavior. This behavior is regulated by the frogs' testosterone levels and androgen receptors, as higher testosterone has been shown to result in more frequent and rounder foot-flagging. It has been hypothesized that sex steroid signaling in adolescents organizes the anatomical "wiring" that establishes the neural control of the hindlimbs used in foot-flagging. It has also been observed that other foot-flagging frog species have higher expression of androgen receptors in their thigh muscles than their non-foot-flagging counterparts. Due to its frequent foot-flagging, M. saxicola has been cited as a potential model to study the effects of sex steroids on animal behavior.

Males will also patrol their rocks and attempt to chase off intruders if calling and foot-flagging do not drive them away. If such behaviors do not work, resident males will fight off intruders by kicking or jumping on top of intruders' heads to other rocks; however, physical combat is rare in this species, and males will only kick intruders if they get within roughly 2 cm of the resident. Combat may last as little as 10 seconds or as long as 2 minutes. Males exhibit calling and foot-flagging more often earlier in the day, when territory defense is more likely to ensure amplexus, which begins in the late morning and early afternoon. Territory defense also has non-reproductive benefits, since remaining on a perch above the water makes predation by Nyctibatrachus major less likely.

=== Reproduction ===
Intruding males will foot flag and kick at amplexed pairs. The frogs in amplexus will respond by kicking the intruder and may move to another area to avoid further harassment. Females dig a 2 x 2 x 2 cm underwater cavity in which to lay their eggs, which are about 2.5 mm in diameter with their jelly coating. Clutch sizes of 154 have been reported for this species. Once the eggs have been laid, the tadpoles are left to care for themselves, as M. saxicola provides no parental care, and parents do not return to the site of oviposition.

== Diseases ==
Infection by the fungus Batrachochytrium dendrobatidis (Bd) may become more common and widespread among M. saxicola populations. Chytridiomycosis thus represents a potential threat to M. saxicola and other endangered endemic frog species in the Western Ghats, as Bd has been linked to declines, extirpations, and, in rare cases, extinctions of other amphibians. There have also been reports of M. saxicola being infected with the following ciliate parasites in their gut: Nyctotherus magnus, Nyctotherus magnus malabarica, Balantidium helenae, Balantidium gracile, Balantidium duodeni, Opalina ranarum, and Opalina coracoideo.

== Threats and conservation ==
M. saxicola is listed as a Vulnerable (VU) species by the IUCN. The major threats to this species include loss of habitat, habitat fragmentation, and human interference. Local villages in the Western Ghats may enter the forest to collect leaf litter for use in fertilizing areca nut gardens or paddy fields. This practice removes a potentially important source of shelter for amphibians and represents a threat to environmental stability, even in the absence of larger damages to the forest. Tea and rubber estates also pollute the water and soil of M. saxicola's habitats with factory wastes, pesticides, and chemical fertilizers, posing a significant threat to the clear streams this species depends on for reproduction. Populations in the regions of Keeriparai and Maramalai have been particularly affected by this problem due to the expansion of rubber planting in these areas over the past 25 to 40 years. Smaller streams have also dried up due to water being redirected to estates for irrigation or factories for other uses, further damaging an essential component of M. saxicola's habitat. These factors have been cited as critical threats to M. saxicola and other amphibians in India, as they can still impact these species even when habitats are protected from deforestation.
