= Forest night frog =

Conservation status
- Data Deficient (IUCN 3.1)

Scientific classification
- Kingdom: Animalia
- Phylum: Chordata
- Class: Amphibia
- Order: Anura
- Family: Nyctibatrachidae
- Genus: Nyctibatrachus
- Species: N. sylvaticus

Binomial name
- Nyctibatrachus sylvaticus Rao, 1937

Species of amphibian

The forest night frog (Nyctibatrachus sylvaticus) is a species of frog in the family Nyctibatrachidae endemic to India. Its natural habitats are tropical moist lowland forests and rivers.

== Taxonomy ==
This species was discovered by C. R. Narayan Rao in 1937, and was thought to have gone extinct after remaining unsighted for 74 years. Its rediscovery in 2011 coincided with the discovery of Nyctibatrachus poocha and others of the genus Nyctibatrachus by herpetologist Sathyabhama Das Biju.
