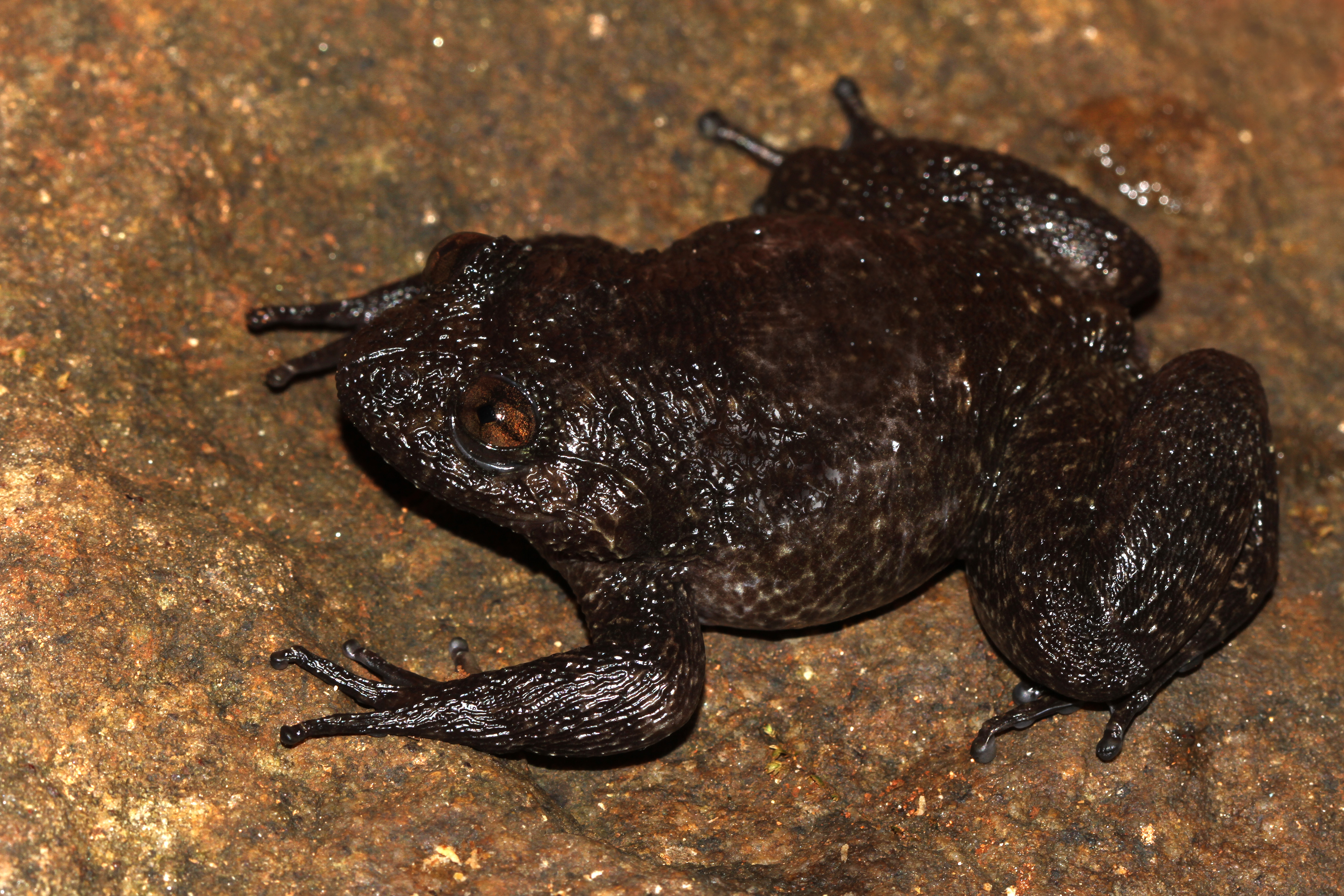

Scientific classification
- Kingdom: Animalia
- Phylum: Chordata
- Class: Amphibia
- Order: Anura
- Family: Nyctibatrachidae
- Genus: Nyctibatrachus
- Species: N. grandis

Binomial name
- Nyctibatrachus grandis Biju et al., 2011

= Nyctibatrachus grandis =

Species of frog

Nyctibatrachus grandis is a species of frog in the genus Nyctibatrachus. The species is also called as "Wayanad Night Frog" and "Wayanad Wrinkled Frog".

== Etymology ==
This species was named using the latin word 'grandis' as the adults are largest in size among the Nyctibatrachus species.
