= Nyctibatrachus indraneili =

Conservation status
- Critically Endangered (IUCN 3.1)

Scientific classification
- Kingdom: Animalia
- Phylum: Chordata
- Class: Amphibia
- Order: Anura
- Family: Nyctibatrachidae
- Genus: Nyctibatrachus
- Species: N. indraneili

Binomial name
- Nyctibatrachus indraneili Biju, Van Bocxlaer, Mahony, Dinesh, Radhakrishnan, Zachariah, Giri, and Bossuyt, 2011

Species of frog

Nyctibatrachus indraneili is a species of frog endemic to India. It is also commonly called Indraneil's night frog.

== Distribution and habitat ==
At the time of describing this species in 2011, it was known only from the Longwood shola forest at Kotagiri in Tamil Nadu. It was found under the rocks of a flowing stream inside a forest. An IUCN assessment published in 2023 assessed the species as Critically Endangered.

== Etymology ==
This species was named after Indraneil Das, a herpetologist from India for his contributions to herpetological research in South Asia.
