= Nyctibatrachus gavi =

Conservation status
- Vulnerable (IUCN 3.1)

Scientific classification
- Kingdom: Animalia
- Phylum: Chordata
- Class: Amphibia
- Order: Anura
- Family: Nyctibatrachidae
- Genus: Nyctibatrachus
- Species: N. gavi

Binomial name
- Nyctibatrachus gavi Biju, Van Bocxlaer, Mahony, Dinesh, Radhakrishnan, Zachariah, Giri, and Bossuyt, 2011

Species of frog

Nyctibatrachus gavi is a species of frog in the family Nyctibatrachidae known from Gavi, Moozhiyar, and Pathanamthitta in the Indian state of Kerala. It is commonly known as the Gavi night frog.

== Description ==
Males of the species have grow to length from 49.5 to 57.5 mm (1.95 to 2.26 in), while females are somewhat larger: attaining lengths from 58.2 to 60.1 mm (2.29 to 2.37 in). The Gavi night frog generally has a robust body with a wide head, and oval snout. In terms of coloration, individuals of N. gavi are light brown, dorsally, with dark stripes between the eyes. Their skin is also wrinkled on the top of the head especially near the snout and between the orbits. The legs are also light brown in colour with darker, blackish bands. Ventrally, the throat is light brown and the underside of the thigh is light grey with dark marbling. Other parts of the limbs (plus the webbing) are dark in colour.

== Distribution ==
Nyctibatrachus gavi is found around the towns of Gavi and Moozhiyar, both of which are in the Indian state of Kerala on the southwest coast of the Indian subcontinent. It has been observed at an elevation of about 1,000 metres (3,280 ft).

== Etymology ==
This species was name after the location Gavi, where it was first found and described.
