= Wrinkled frog =

Wrinkled frog may refer to:

- Abdulali's wrinkled frog, a frog endemic to the Western Ghats, India
- Deccan wrinkled frog, a frog endemic to the Western Ghats, India
- Giant wrinkled frog, a frog endemic to the Western Ghats, India
- Japanese wrinkled frog, a frog native to Japan
- Kalakad wrinkled frog, a frog endemic to the Western Ghats, India
- Large wrinkled frog, a frog endemic to India
- Pigmy wrinkled frog, a frog endemic to southern Western Ghats of India
- Sacred swamp wrinkled frog, a frog endemic to the Western Ghats, India
- Smith's wrinkled frog, a frog found in Thailand and possibly Myanmar
- Wrinkled ground frog, a frog found in the Philippines, Palau, Fiji, New Guinea, and in the Admiralty, Bismarck, and Solomon Islands
