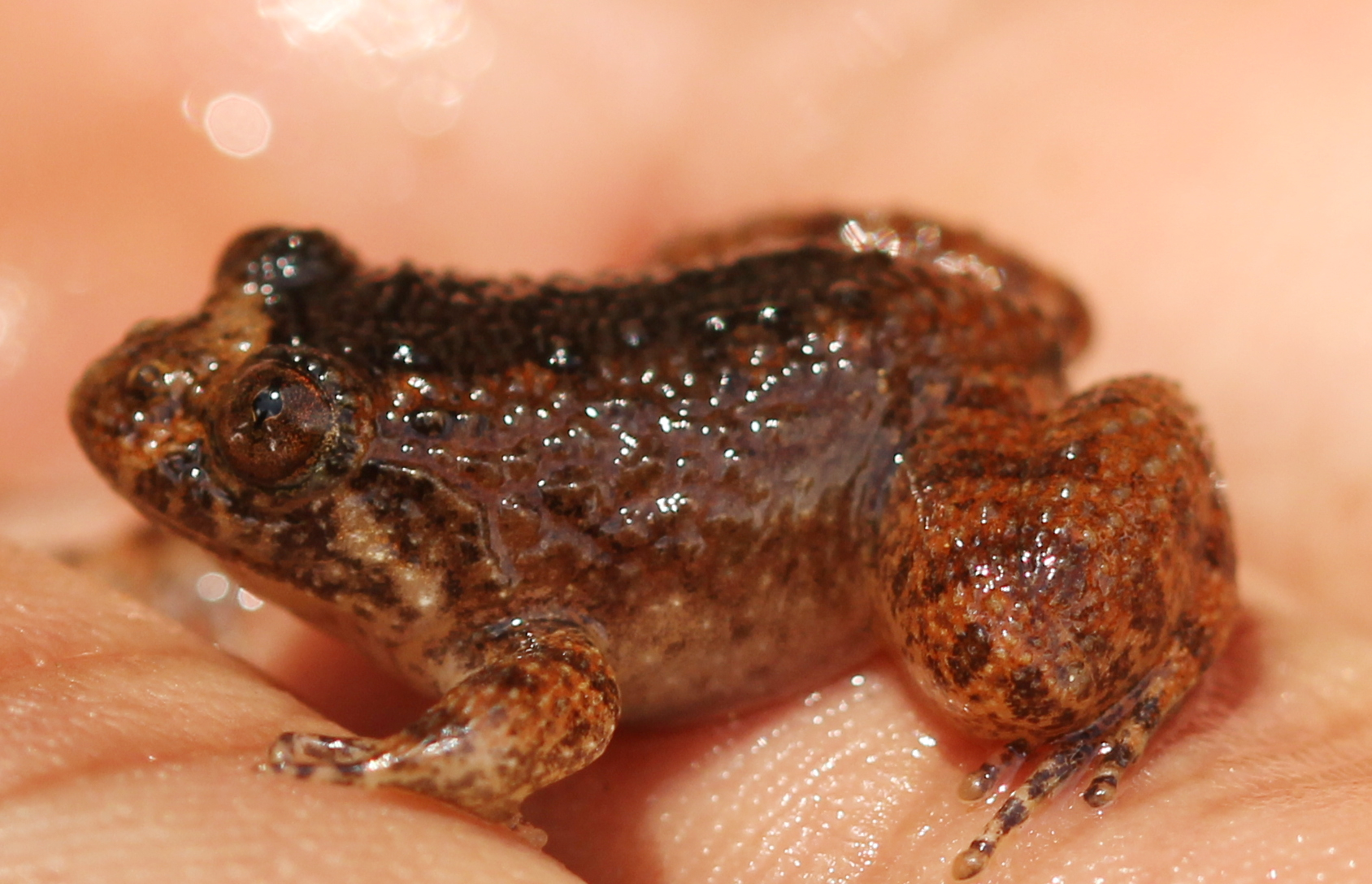

Conservation status
- Data Deficient (IUCN 3.1)

Scientific classification
- Kingdom: Animalia
- Phylum: Chordata
- Class: Amphibia
- Order: Anura
- Family: Nyctibatrachidae
- Genus: Nyctibatrachus
- Species: N. kempholeyensis

Binomial name
- Nyctibatrachus kempholeyensis (Rao, 1937)

Synonyms
- Nannobatrachus kempholeyensis Rao, 1937

= Kempholey night frog =

Species of amphibian

The Kempholey night frog (Nyctibatrachus kempholeyensis) is a species of frog in the family Nyctibatrachidae.

== Geographical range ==
It is endemic to the Western Ghats, India, where it is found between Karnataka and Kerala.

== Habitat ==
Its natural habitats are tropical moist lowland forests and rivers.

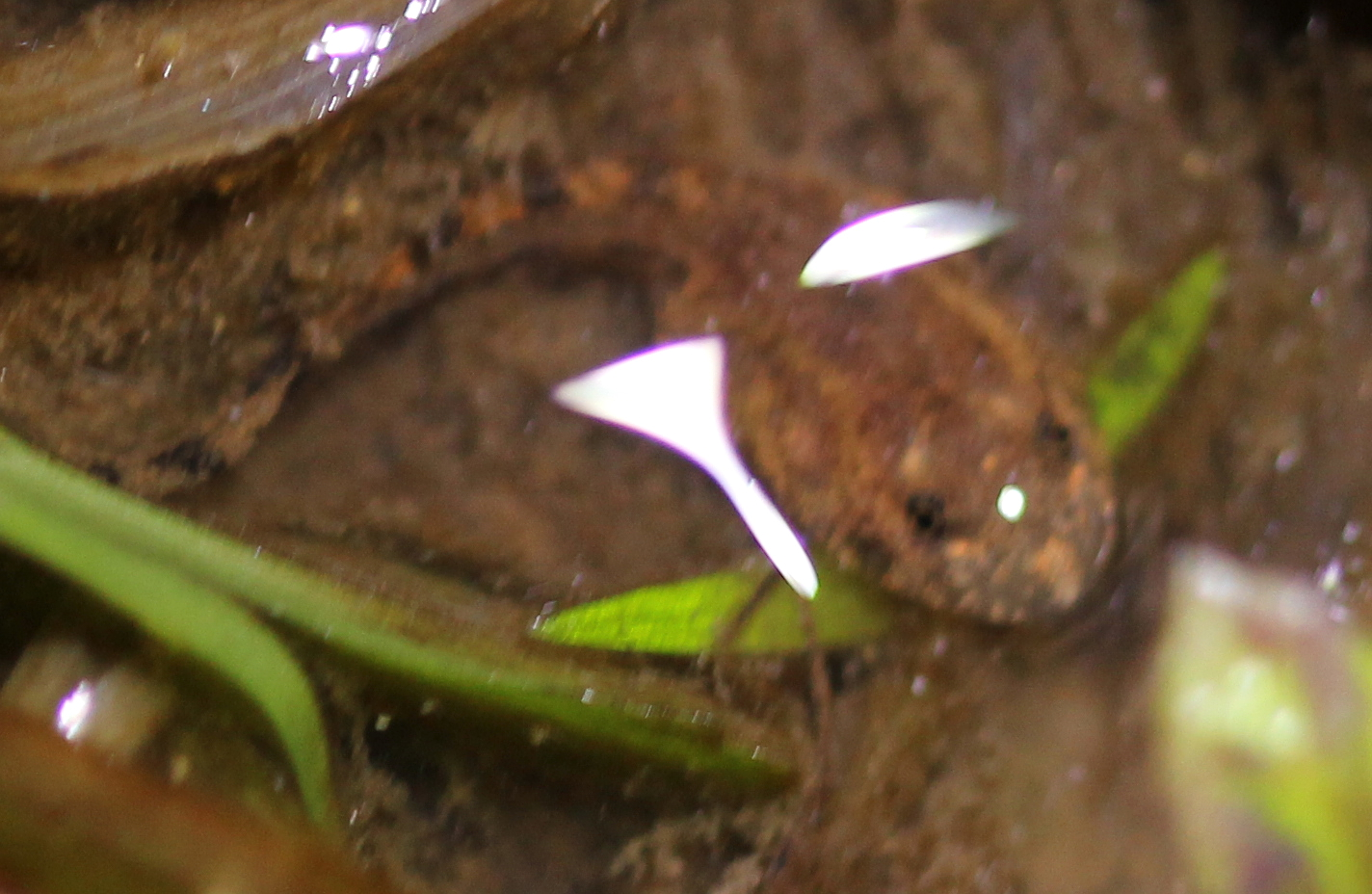
Nyctibatrachus kempholeyensis tadpole in a lowland stream

== Taxonomy ==
This species was discovered by C. R. Narayan Rao and was thought to have been extinct after remaining unsighted for 74 years. Its rediscovery coincided with the discovery of Nyctibatrachus poocha and others of the genus Nyctibatrachus by herpetologist Sathyabhama Das Biju.
