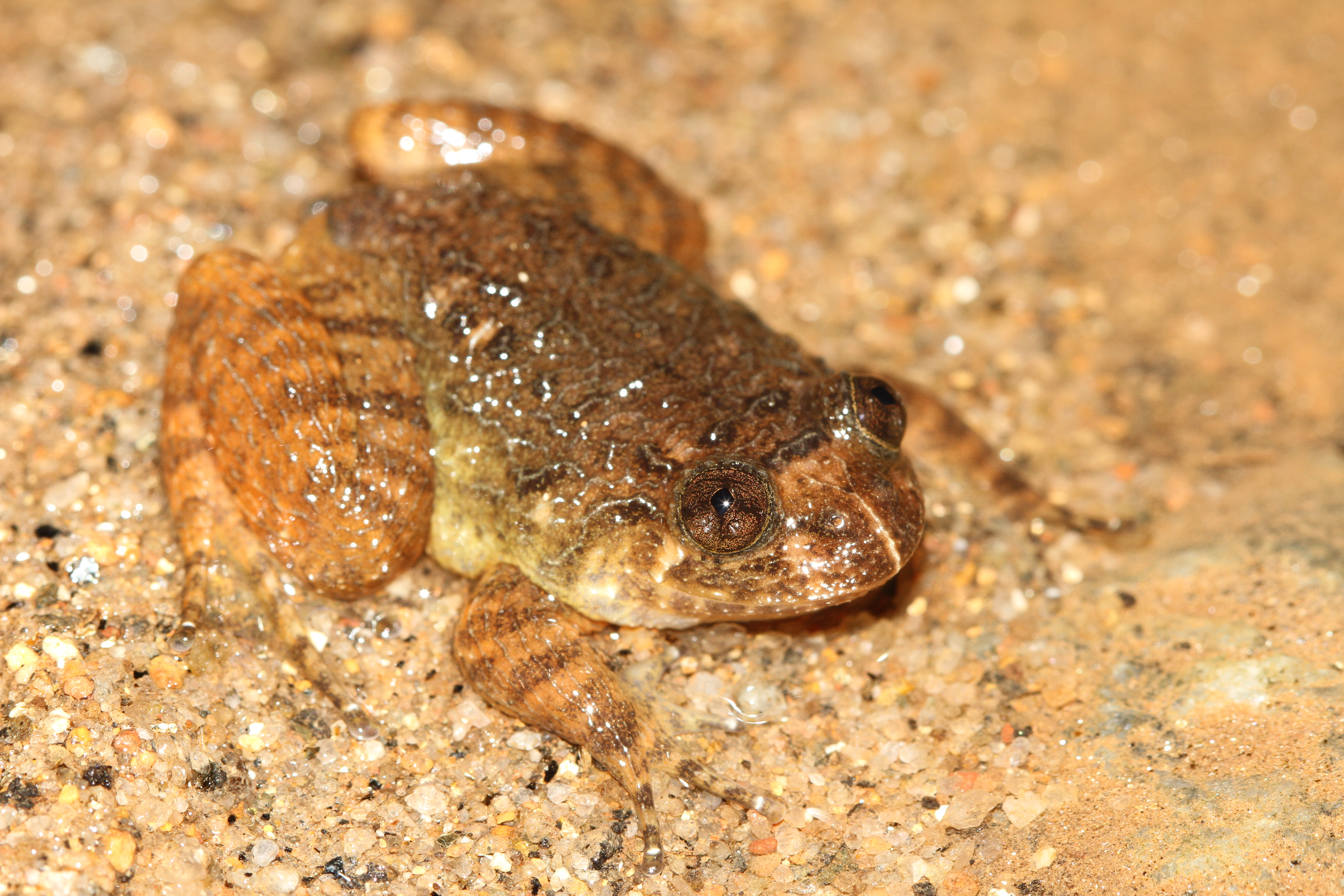

Scientific classification
- Kingdom: Animalia
- Phylum: Chordata
- Class: Amphibia
- Order: Anura
- Family: Nyctibatrachidae
- Genus: Nyctibatrachus
- Species: N. poocha

Binomial name
- Nyctibatrachus poocha Biju, 2011

= Meowing night frog =

Species of amphibian

The meowing night frog (Nyctibatrachus poocha) is one of 12 species of frogs in the genus Nyctibatrachus discovered in September 2011. It is found primarily in the Western Ghats, India. The team, composed of researchers from the Bombay Natural History Society, Zoological Survey of India and Vrije Universiteit Brussel, led by herpetologist Sathyabhama Das Biju of the University of Delhi, used morphological traits and molecular markers to identify the 12 new species and three others which were thought to have been extinct. The meowing night frog species name is derived from the Malayalam word for domestic cat- poocha, due to its distinct cat-like call.

According to Biju, the 12 new species, described in Zootaxa journal, were exclusive to the Western Ghats and one of the ancient groups of frogs that coexisted with dinosaurs. "Night frogs (Nyctibatrachus), which were exclusively seen in Western Ghats, have unique breeding behaviour. These frogs successfully complete their breeding without any physical contact between male and female," Biju told the Press Trust of India.

The findings also led to the rediscovery of three frog species which were unseen for over 75 years since their original descriptions by C. R. Narayan Rao in 1920 and 1937, respectively, after scientists "had completely ignored these animals, thinking they were lost." The Nyctibatrachus sanctipalustris (Coorg night frog) was unseen for 91 years and the Kempholey (Nyctibatrachus kempholeyensis) and forest night frogs (Nyctibatrachus sylvaticus) for 75 years.
