= Coorg night frog =

Conservation status
- Endangered (IUCN 3.1)

Scientific classification
- Kingdom: Animalia
- Phylum: Chordata
- Class: Amphibia
- Order: Anura
- Family: Nyctibatrachidae
- Genus: Nyctibatrachus
- Species: N. sanctipalustris

Binomial name
- Nyctibatrachus sanctipalustris Rao, 1920

Species of amphibian

Nyctibatrachus sanctipalustris (Coorg night frog or sacred swamp wrinkled frog) is a species of frog in the family Nyctibatrachidae from India. The specific name, sanctipalustris, "holy swamp" in Latin, refers to the type locality, "the sacred swamps of the Cauvery (river)...Coorg, India".

== Distribution and habitat ==
Nyctibatrachus sanctipalustris is endemic to the Western Ghats, India. All known populations are within Karnataka state. It is a semiaquatic species that lives in marshes within moist tropical forests.

== Rediscovery ==
This species was described by C. R. Narayan Rao in 1920, and was thought to have been extinct after remaining unsighted for 91 years. Its rediscovery in 2011 coincided with the discovery of Nyctibatrachus poocha and others of the genus Nyctibatrachus by herpetologist Sathyabhama Das Biju.
