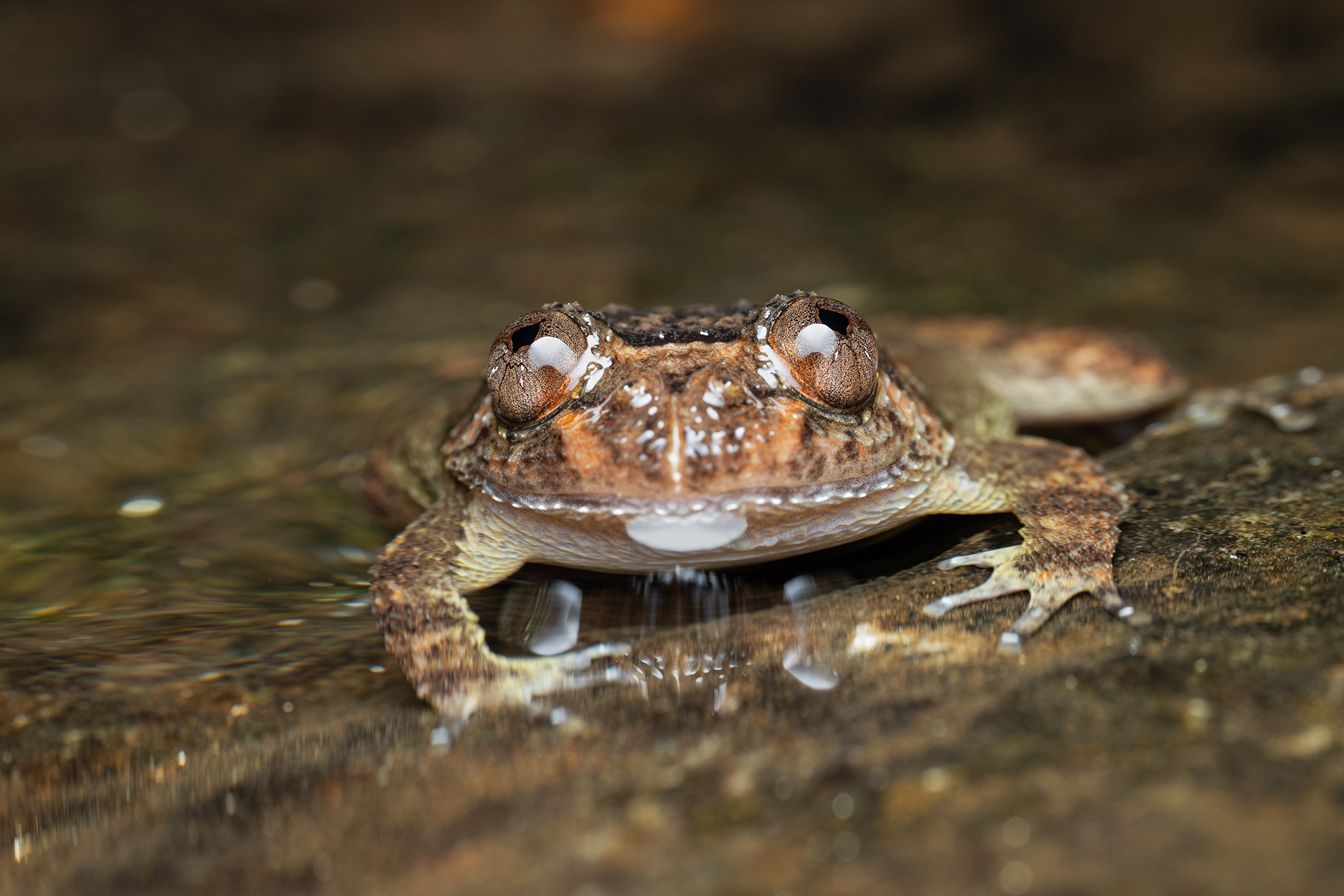

Scientific classification
- Kingdom: Animalia
- Phylum: Chordata
- Class: Amphibia
- Order: Anura
- Family: Nyctibatrachidae
- Genus: Nyctibatrachus
- Species: N. vrijeuni

Binomial name
- Nyctibatrachus vrijeuni Biju, 2011

= VUB night frog =

Species of amphibian

The VUB night frog (Nyctibatrachus vrijeuni) is a species of frogs in the family Nyctibatrachidae. Both the specific name, "vrijeuni", and the acronym in the common name, "VUB", refer to Vrije Universiteit Brussel, the Free University of Brussels. It is one of 12 new species of frogs in the genus Nyctibatrachus discovered in September 2011. It is found exclusively in the Western Ghats, India.
