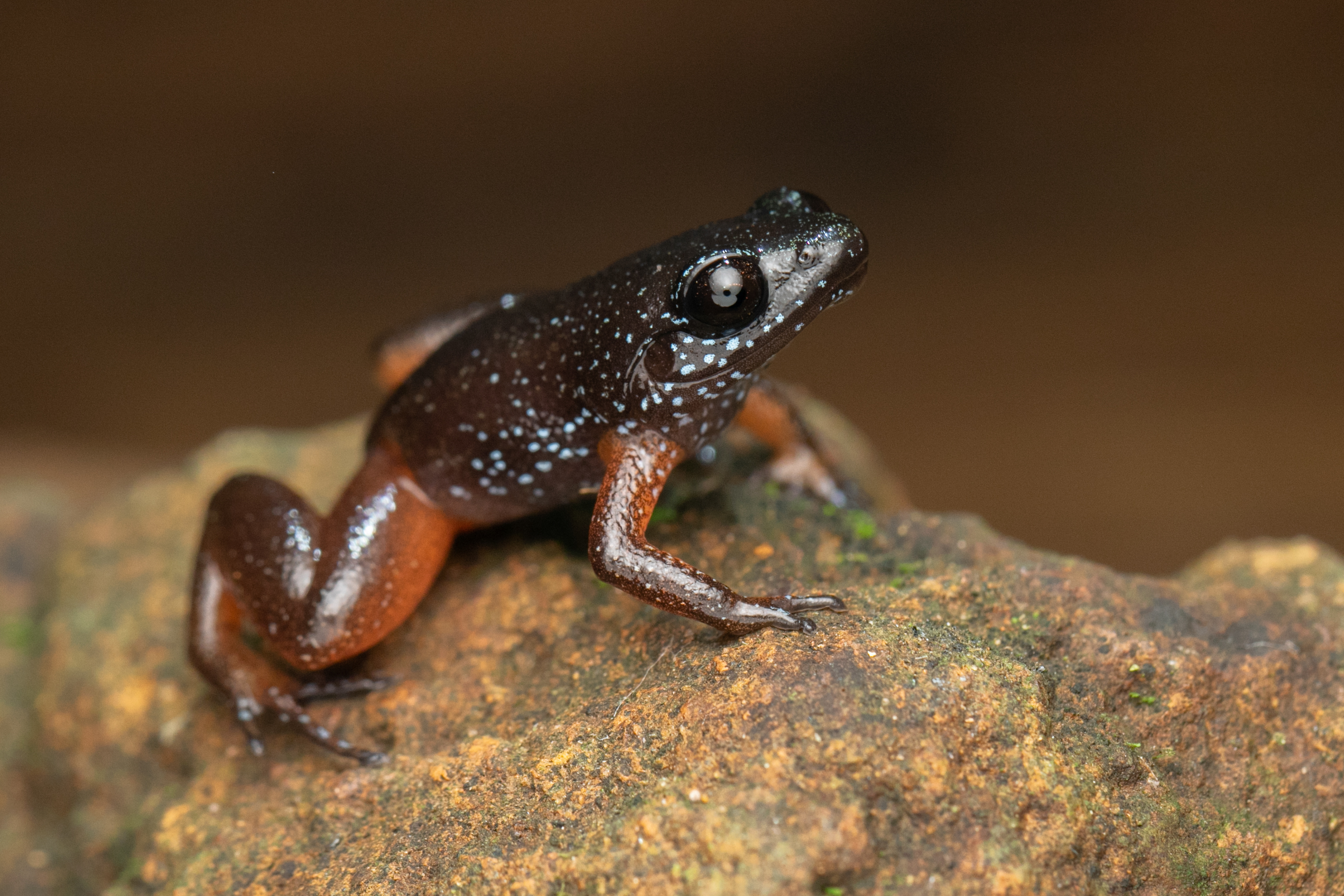
- Astrobatrachus kurichiyana

Scientific classification
- Kingdom: Animalia
- Phylum: Chordata
- Class: Amphibia
- Order: Anura
- Family: Nyctibatrachidae
- Subfamily: Astrobatrachinae; Vijayakumar et al., 2019
- Genus: Astrobatrachus; Vijayakumar et al., 2019
- Species: A. kurichiyana

Binomial name
- Astrobatrachus kurichiyana Vijayakumar et al., 2019

= Astrobatrachus =

Genus of amphibians

Astrobatrachus is a genus of frogs in the family Nyctibatrachidae that is endemic to the Western Ghats of India. It is the only member of the subfamily Astrobatrachinae and is represented by a single species, Astrobatrachus kurichiyana, commonly known as the starry dwarf frog.

It was discovered in the shola cloud forests of the Wayanad Plateau, and is considered a relict species due to its very small range restricted to certain refugia habitats. It is genetically highly different from both Nyctibatrachus and Lankanectes, with their last common sister species hypothesized to have existed several millions of years ago. It can physically be distinguished by its brown coloration with an orange belly and bluish-white spots. This species is threatened by its very small distribution which completely falls outside protected areas, making it vulnerable to habitat degradation.
