= Nyctibatrachus shiradi =

Scientific classification
- Kingdom: Animalia
- Phylum: Chordata
- Class: Amphibia
- Order: Anura
- Family: Nyctibatrachidae
- Genus: Nyctibatrachus
- Species: N. shiradi

Binomial name
- Nyctibatrachus shiradi Biju, Van Bocxlaer, Mahony, Dinesh, Radhakrishnan, Zachariah, Giri, and Bossuyt, 2011

Species of frog

Nyctibatrachus shiradi is a species of frog found endemic to Western Ghats of Karnataka. It is commonly known as Shiradi Night Frog and Shiradi Wrinkled Frog.

== Distribution ==
This species of frogs were found only around Kempholay, Kottigehara and Kudremukh–Malleshwaram in Karnataka.

== Etymology ==
This species is named after the Shiradi ghat, the hills that connect the type locality of the frogs.
