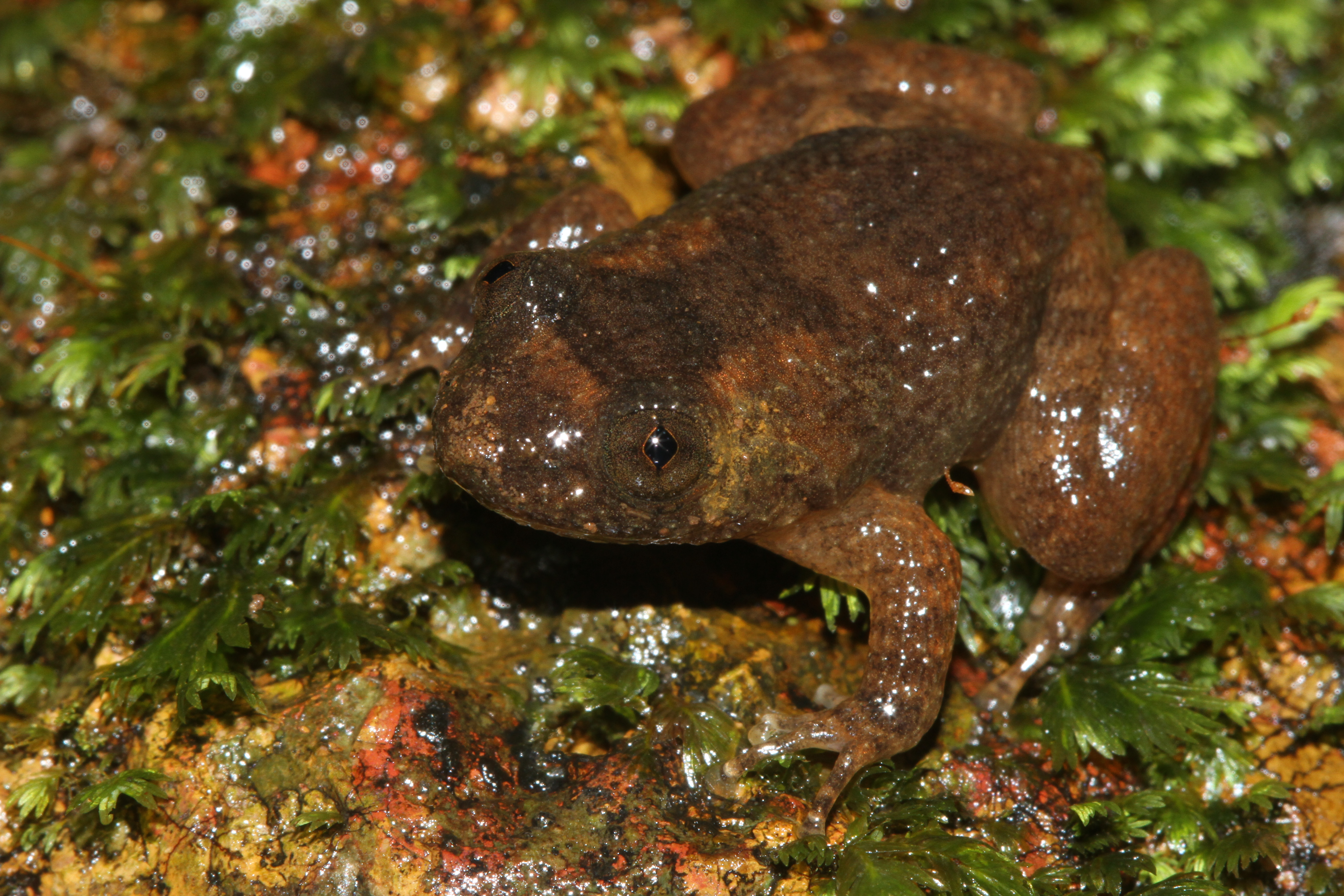

Scientific classification
- Kingdom: Animalia
- Phylum: Chordata
- Class: Amphibia
- Order: Anura
- Family: Nyctibatrachidae
- Genus: Nyctibatrachus
- Species: N. danieli

Binomial name
- Nyctibatrachus danieli Biju et al., 2011

= Nyctibatrachus danieli =

Species of frog

Nyctibatrachus danieli is a species of frog in the genus Nyctibatrachus known only from Humbarli village and Amboli in Maharashtra, India. Their common name is Daniel's night frog or Daniel's wrinkled frog.

== Etymology ==
This species was named after J.C. Daniel for his contributions to Indian wildlife research.
