= Nyctibatrachus jog =

Conservation status
- Vulnerable (IUCN 3.1)

Scientific classification
- Kingdom: Animalia
- Phylum: Chordata
- Class: Amphibia
- Order: Anura
- Family: Nyctibatrachidae
- Genus: Nyctibatrachus
- Species: N. jog

Binomial name
- Nyctibatrachus jog Biju et al., 2011

Species of amphibian

Nyctibatrachus jog, the Jog's night frog or the Jog wrinkled frog, is a species of frog in the family Nyctibatrachidae. It is endemic to the Western Ghats of India.

It is one of 34 species of nocturnal frogs in the genus Nyctibatrachus.

== Description ==
Nyctibatrachus jog grows to a length of 32 to 39 mm (1.3 to 1.5 in). It is a plump frog, with a wide, short head, and a skin fold from the eye to the shoulder. The fore legs are very short and the hands are large, with broad discs on the finger tips. The hind legs are longer and the feet have partially webbed toes and disc-like toe pads. The colour of the dorsal surface is black with grey markings and the limbs are grey with dark bands. The throat region is reddish-brown and the belly is pale grey. The male has reddish-brown femoral glands on his hind legs and a vocal sac that inflates sidewards.

== Distribution and habitat ==
This species is known only from the Western Ghat Mountains in the vicinity of the Jog Falls on the River Sharavathi in Karnataka State, India, at a height of 600 m (2,000 ft) above sea level. It lives in seasonal streams or among vegetation close to the streams which swell during the monsoon season.

== Etymology ==
This frog species was named after Jog Falls in Karnataka where the holotype was collected.

== Reproduction ==
Breeding takes place during the monsoon season. The male chooses a suitable spot for egg deposition on a branch, leaf, or steep rock about a metre (yard) above a stream. Here, he calls to attract a female. When she arrives, he grasps her in a vigorous amplexus, but the eggs are not laid until after he dismounts. The female attaches the cluster of eggs to the spot chosen by the male and then departs. The male then stands over the eggs. Over the period of about eight days until the eggs hatch, both parents remain close to the clutch, often straddling it, presumably preventing the eggs from becoming dehydrated and preventing predators from eating them. When the tadpoles emerge from the gelatinous coating of the eggs, they fall into the water below, where they continue their development. They undergo metamorphosis in about 32 days.
