= Nyctibatrachus pillaii =

Scientific classification
- Kingdom: Animalia
- Phylum: Chordata
- Class: Amphibia
- Order: Anura
- Family: Nyctibatrachidae
- Genus: Nyctibatrachus
- Species: N. pillaii

Binomial name
- Nyctibatrachus pillaii Biju, Van Bocxlaer, Mahony, Dinesh, Radhakrishnan, Zachariah, Giri & Bossuyt, 2011

Species of frog

Nyctibatrachus pillaii, also known as Pillai's night frog, is a small amphibian found in the Western Ghats of India.
