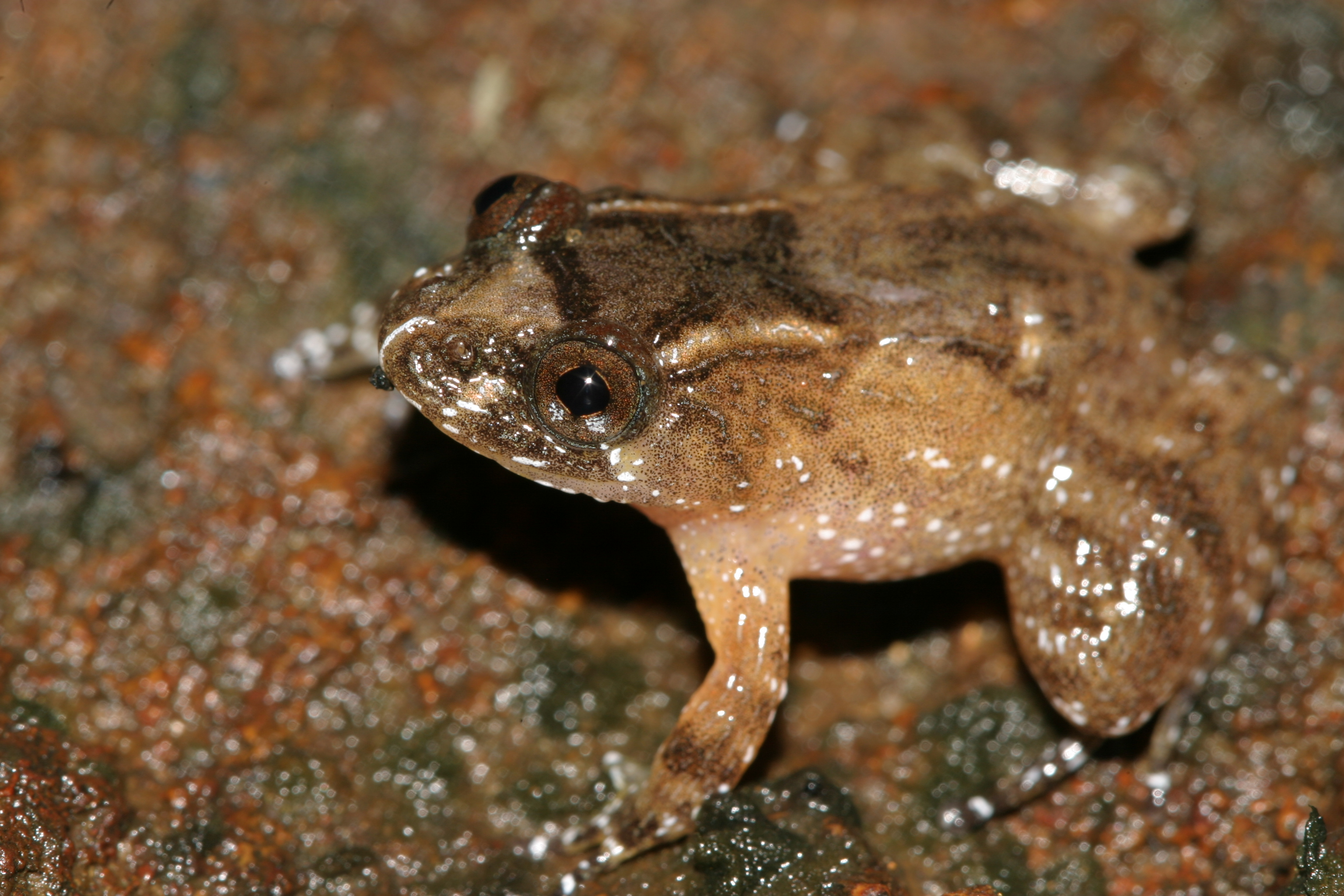

Conservation status
- Endangered (IUCN 3.1)

Scientific classification
- Kingdom: Animalia
- Phylum: Chordata
- Class: Amphibia
- Order: Anura
- Family: Nyctibatrachidae
- Genus: Nyctibatrachus
- Species: N. minor

Binomial name
- Nyctibatrachus minor Inger, Shaffer, Koshy & Bakde, 1984

= Nyctibatrachus minor =

Species of frog

Nyctibatrachus minor is a species of frog in the family Nyctibatrachidae endemic to the Western Ghats, India. Its natural habitats are subtropical or tropical moist lowland forest, subtropical or tropical moist montane forest, and rivers. It is threatened by habitat loss.
