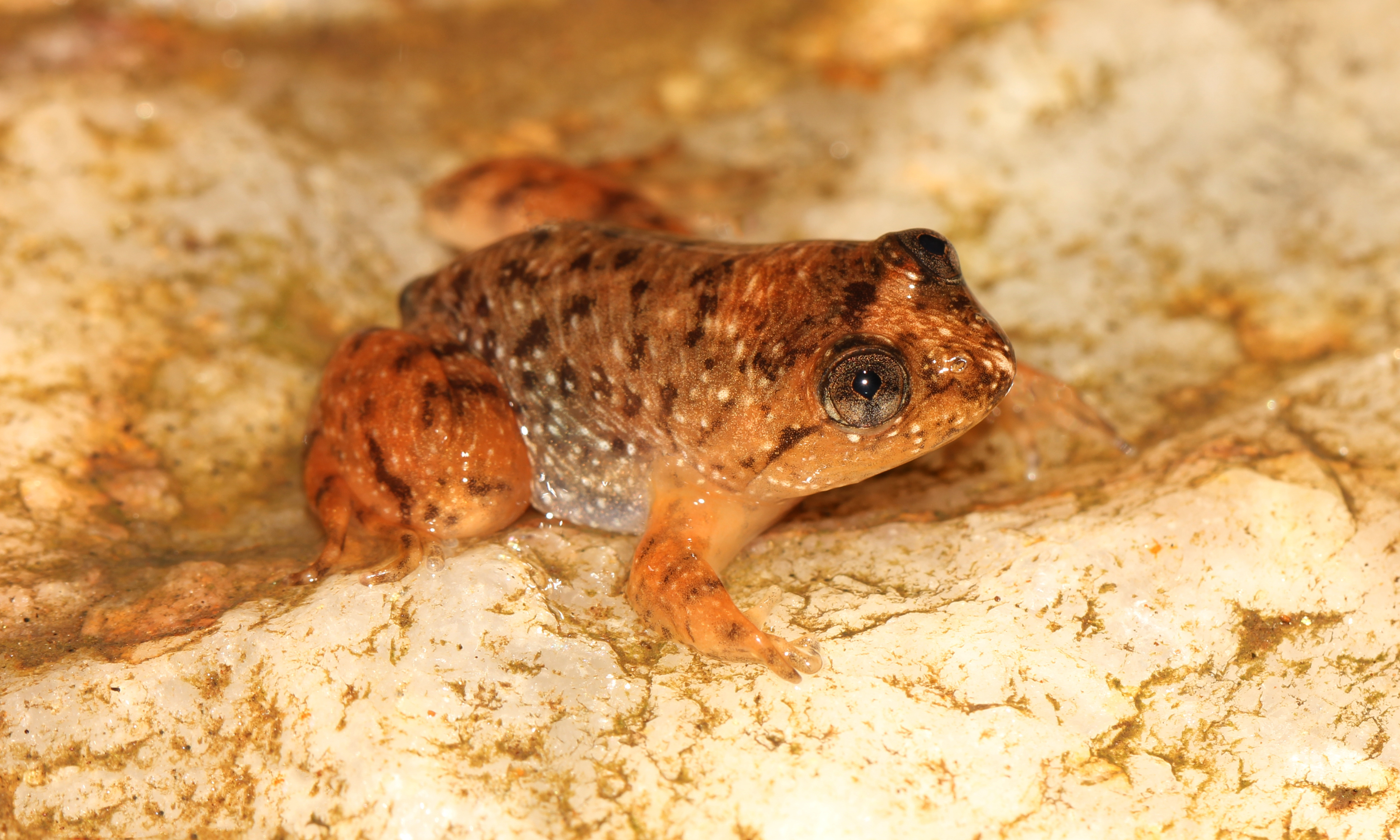

Conservation status
- Critically Endangered (IUCN 3.1)

Scientific classification
- Kingdom: Animalia
- Phylum: Chordata
- Class: Amphibia
- Order: Anura
- Family: Nyctibatrachidae
- Genus: Lankanectes
- Species: L. pera

Binomial name
- Lankanectes pera Senevirathne et al, 2018

= Lankanectes pera =

Species of frog, common name corrugated frogs

Lankanectes pera is a species of frog in the family Nyctibatrachidae. It is the second species found within the genus Lankanectes. It is endemic to Sri Lanka. Its common name is corrugated frogs.

== Etymology ==
The specific name pera refers the University of Peradeniya, Sri Lanka, where its alumni affectionately refer to it as Pera.

== Description ==
It is larger than the Lankanectes corrugatus. Body length of mature male is 66.0 mm and mature female ranges from 51.0 mm to 55.8 mm. Dorsal surface chocolate brown with unequal dark patches and small pale spots. Venter grayish. A light-brown bar is present with dark edges on inter-orbital area. There are white tubercles found on throat. Edge of the upper lip, toes, foot and flank are uniformly gray. Body stout with dorsally flat head. Head with a cephalic knob. Canthal edges indistinct. Loreal region convex. Nostrils oval. Tympanum, cephalic ridges and pineal ocellus absent. Tusk-like vomerine teeth present. Large tongue emarginated without a lingual papilla. There are two fang-like processes found on the mandible. Dorsal surface of head and body covered possess corrugations. Glandular warts are white-tipped. Finger tips round and enlarge without adhesive discs. Webbing on fingers and nuptial pads absent.

== Threats ==
There are currently many different threats that concern the corrugated frogs as they are currently critically endangered according to the IUCN Red List. The species resides in high altitudes and is limited in distribution due to habitat destruction. Much of this habitat deterioration is caused by increasing climate change. In Sri Lanka where the corrugated frogs are located, rainfall per year has been declining especially in the western slopes. This has caused increasing dry periods that threaten Lankanectes pera the existence and well-being of the species. In addition to this, the increase in annual temperature has risen across the country in the past century by about 1.1 °C (34.0 °F). These factors greatly increase the risk of forest fires that further damage the frog's habitat.

The frog species currently resides in the Knuckles Mountain Forest Reserve. This reserve faces threats that include extensive agricultural practices, illegal cardamom plantations, and the restless pollution from pesticide use. The unregulated research work and construction of resorts and other houses, uncontrolled tourism, and human set forest fires continue to be growing concerns in the efforts to save the environment of the corrugated frogs along with the species itself.

== Conservation ==
The corrugated frogs are currently a critically endangered species and due to its specialized habitat, it requires immediate conservation efforts if it is not going to go extinct. Its current required climatic conditions for survival are predicted to deteriorate because of current global warming trends. The Knuckles, or the area in which the species is located, is currently a mountain refuge for 8 micro endemic frog species also considered critically endangered or endangered. So far the conservation of these species has relied on this Knuckles mountain and continues management of protected areas along with protection of streams and forests where the frogs are also found.

== Ecology ==
The corrugated frog species is restricted to streams which flow through high peaks mountain forests. These streams are typically clear, shallow and slow flowing, with rock-strewn substrates. They are mainly found in the Knuckles Mountains, although they have also been spotted in the Dothalugala, Bambrella, and Riverstone regions of Sri Lanka. The frog's distribution is about 89 km^{2} (34 sq mi) in elevations between 1,260 and 1,600 m (4,130 and 5,250 ft) ASL. The species is found very rarely. When found, there are typically only a few individuals found at a time. Males have been found under rocks or rock-crevices in the flowing water. During the daytime, some males vocalize, using their mating call, although typically males vocalize at night. They have been seen to vocalize especially after light rain. Tadpoles of the species are large. They are found in deeper regions of the stream. This is usually where there is a surplus of decaying vegetation. Since the population is already scarce and only found in specific regions, it does not tolerate environmental disruption very well. Due to this the decreasing population is assumed from the ongoing decline in the quality and extent of the species habitat, classifying the species as critically endangered.
