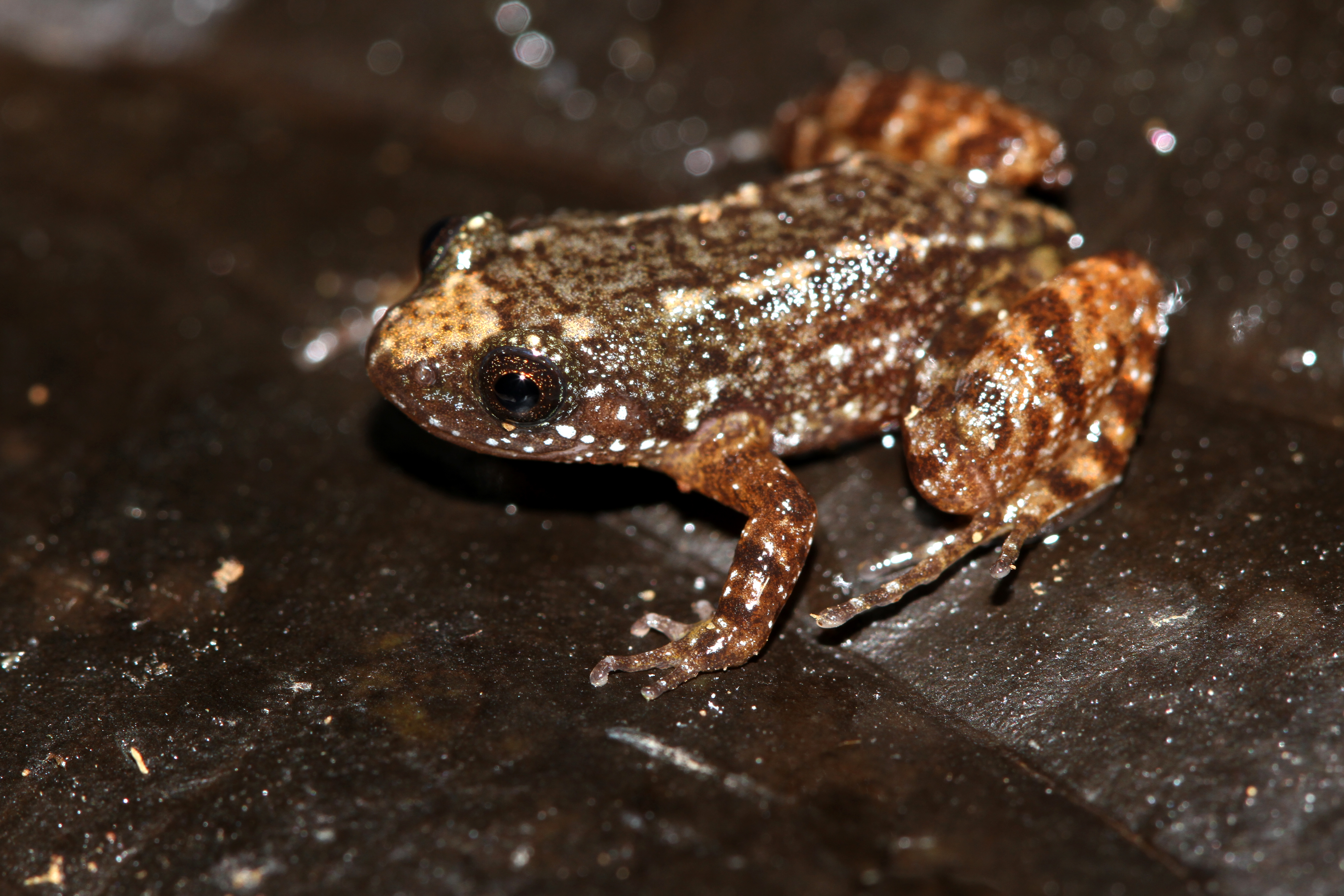

Conservation status
- Data Deficient (IUCN 3.1)

Scientific classification
- Kingdom: Animalia
- Phylum: Chordata
- Class: Amphibia
- Order: Anura
- Family: Nyctibatrachidae
- Genus: Nyctibatrachus
- Species: N. minimus

Binomial name
- Nyctibatrachus minimus Biju, Van Bocxlaer, Giri, Roelants, Nagaraju & Franky Bossuyt, 2007

= Nyctibatrachus minimus =

Species of amphibian

Nyctibatrachus minimus is a species of frogs in the family Nyctibatrachidae. It is the smallest known frog in the genus Nyctibatrachus and was recently discovered from Kurichiyarmala in the Western Ghats or Wayanad, Kerala.

Its most distinctive feature is the small adult snout-vent length, averaging only 12.3 mm in adult males (N = 15).

Miniaturization in Nyctibatrachus species seems to be associated with absence of webbing on toes and fingers, which may have resulted from evolutionary specialization to life in terrestrial habitats.
