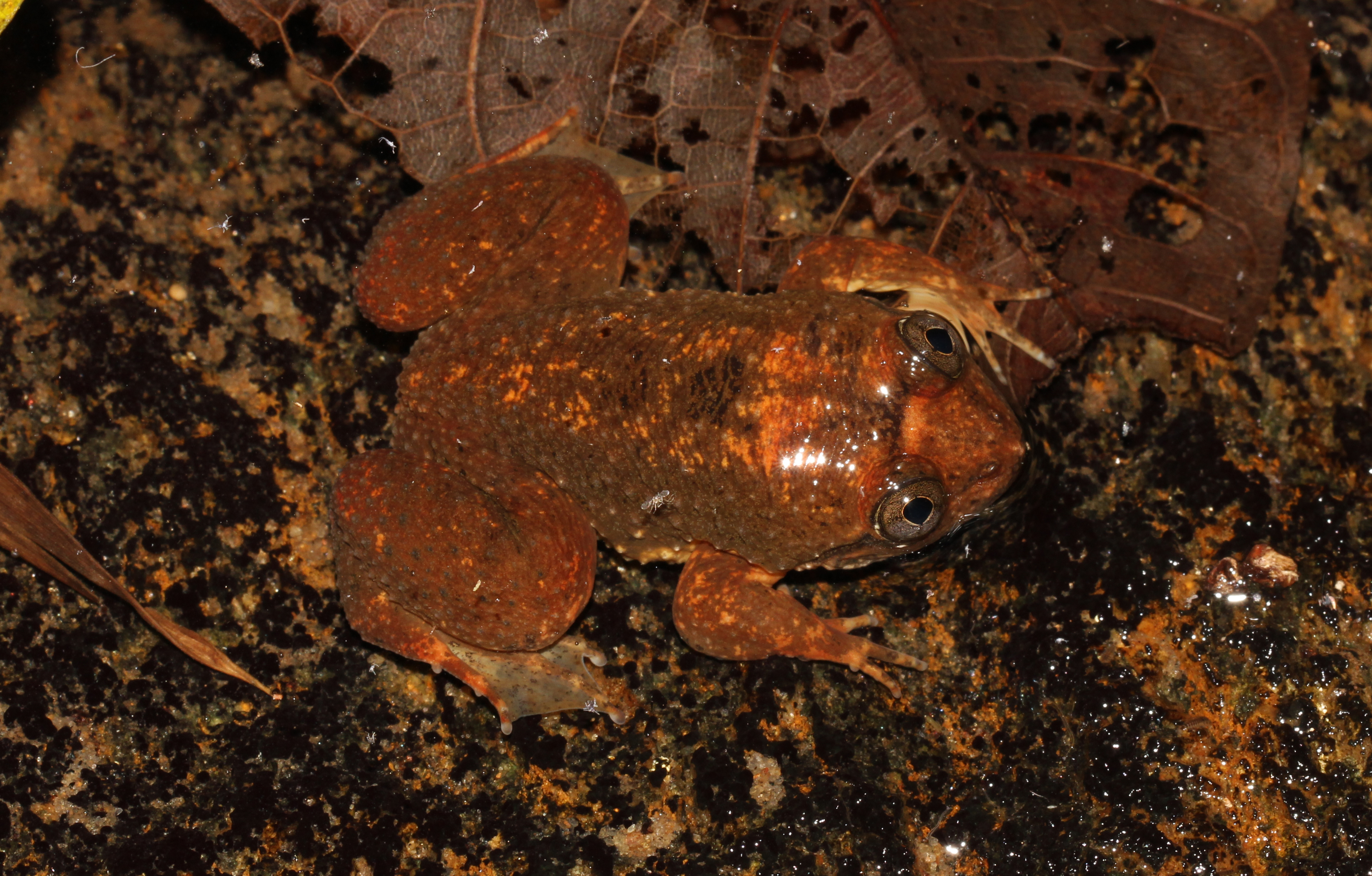

Conservation status
- Near Threatened (IUCN 3.1)

Scientific classification
- Kingdom: Animalia
- Phylum: Chordata
- Class: Amphibia
- Order: Anura
- Family: Nyctibatrachidae
- Genus: Lankanectes
- Species: L. corrugatus

Binomial name
- Lankanectes corrugatus (Peters, 1863)

Synonyms
- Rana corrugata Peters, 1863

= Lankanectes corrugatus =

Species of amphibian

Lankanectes corrugatus (common names: Sri Lanka wart frog, corrugated water frog) is a species of frog in the family Nyctibatrachidae. It was once monotypic within the genus Lankanectes, until the second species - Lankanectes pera was described in 2018 from Knuckles Mountain Range. It is endemic to Sri Lanka.

L. corrugatus is an aquatic frog species inhabiting slow-moving rivers in marshy areas. It is a common species. Threats to it are agrochemical pollution and wetland reclamation for housing and vegetable farms.
