= Nyctibatrachus kumbara =

Scientific classification
- Kingdom: Animalia
- Phylum: Chordata
- Class: Amphibia
- Order: Anura
- Family: Nyctibatrachidae
- Genus: Nyctibatrachus
- Species: N. kumbara

Binomial name
- Nyctibatrachus kumbara Gururaja, Dinesh, Priti, and Ravikanth, 2014

Species of frog

Nyctibatrachus kumbara, common name Kumbara night frog, is a species of frog in the family Nyctibatrachidae endemic to the Western Ghats of India.
