= Nyctibatrachus tunga =

Scientific classification
- Kingdom: Animalia
- Phylum: Chordata
- Class: Amphibia
- Order: Anura
- Family: Nyctibatrachidae
- Genus: Nyctibatrachus
- Species: N. tunga

Binomial name
- Nyctibatrachus tunga Kumar, Vishwajith, Anisha, Dayananda, Gururaja & Priti, 2022

Species of frog

Nyctibatrachus tunga is a species of frog endemic to the Western Ghats of Karnataka. It is also commonly called as Tunga River Night Frog or Tunga Wrinkled Frog.

== Distribution ==
At the time of describing the species in 2022, it was known to be found only in the streams present in the evergreen forests and coffee estates of the upper catchments of the river Tunga.

== Etymology ==
This species was named after the river Tunga since the species was recorded from the catchment area of the river.
