= Bombay frog =

Bombay frog may refer to:

- Bombay night frog (Nyctibatrachus humayuni), a frog in the family Nyctibatrachidae endemic to the Western Ghats of Maharashtra state, India
- Bombay wart frog (Zakerana syhadrensis), a frog in the family Dicroglossidae native to India, Sri Lanka, Pakistan, Nepal and Bangladesh
