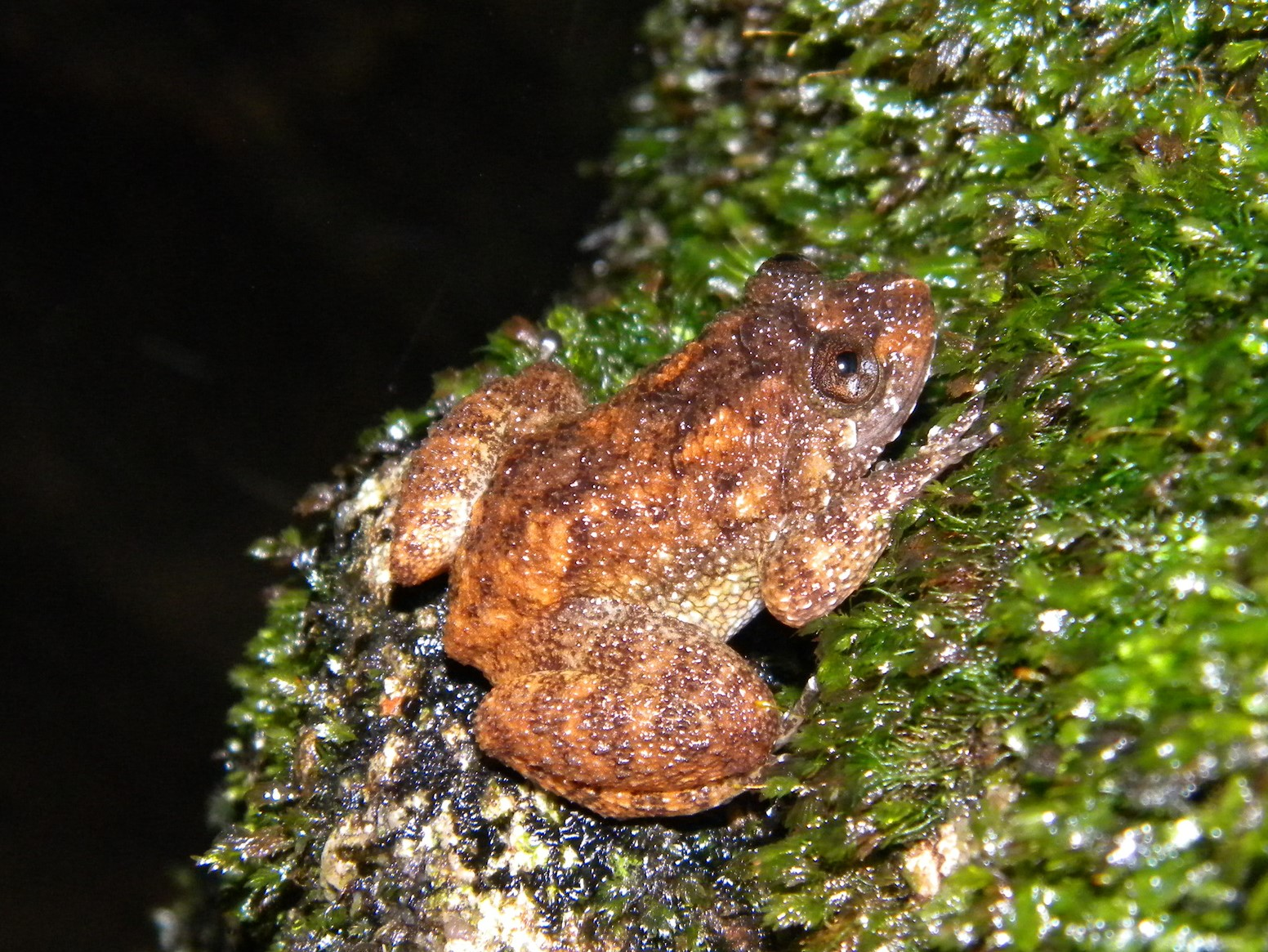

Conservation status
- Endangered (IUCN 3.1)

Scientific classification
- Kingdom: Animalia
- Phylum: Chordata
- Class: Amphibia
- Order: Anura
- Family: Nyctibatrachidae
- Genus: Nyctibatrachus
- Species: N. aliciae

Binomial name
- Nyctibatrachus aliciae Inger, Shaffer, Koshy & Bakde, 1984

= Nyctibatrachus aliciae =

Species of amphibian

Nyctibatrachus aliciae, commonly known as Alicia's night frog or Alice's night frog, is a species of frog in the family Nyctibatrachidae. It is endemic to the southern Western Ghats in Ponmudi and Athirimala in Kerala, India. These frogs occur in riparian habitats and in streams in tropical moist evergreen and semi-evergreen forests, tolerating some degree of habitat modification. The species, though locally common, has a small distribution are and is threatened by habitat loss.
