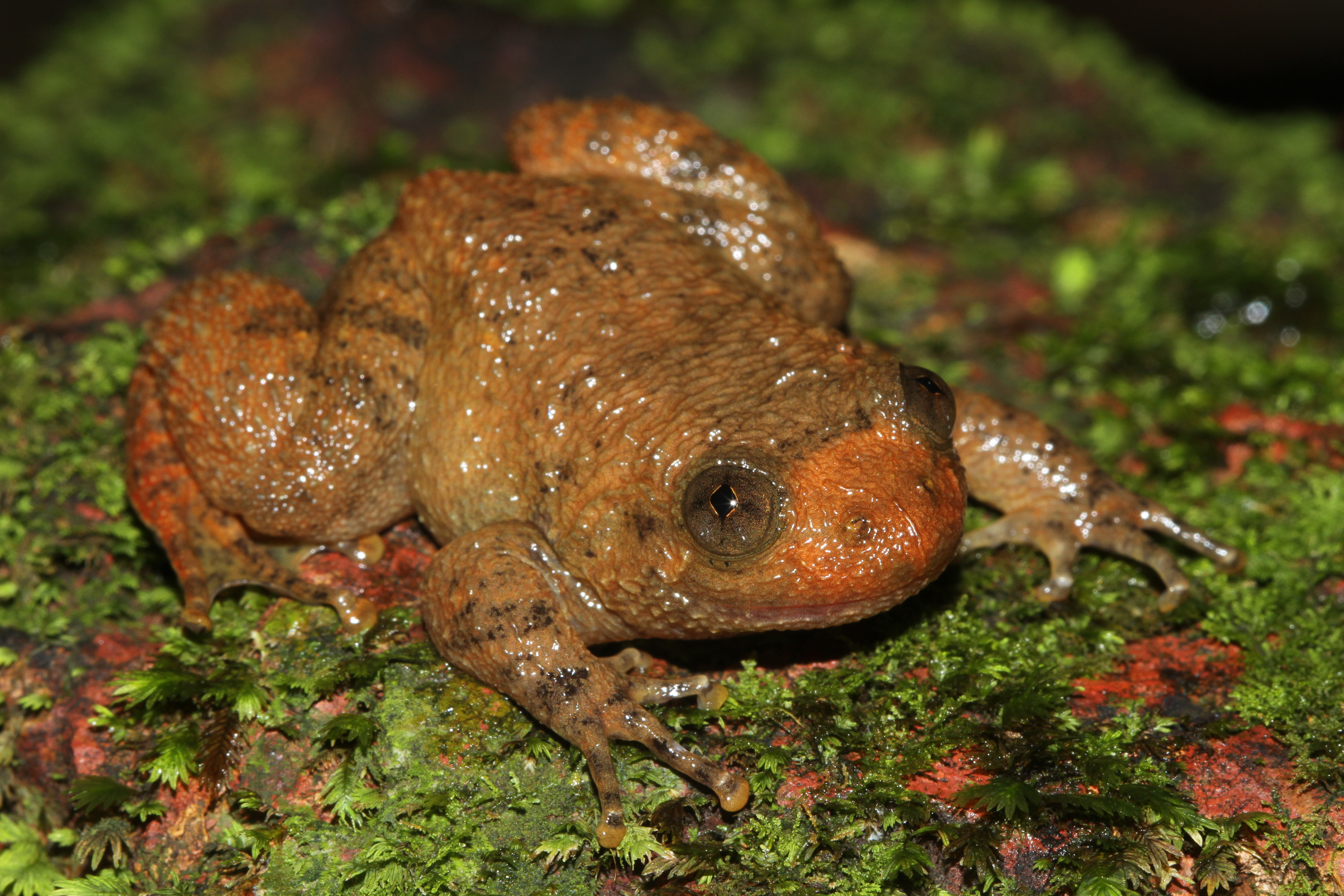

Conservation status
- Near Threatened (IUCN 3.1)

Scientific classification
- Kingdom: Animalia
- Phylum: Chordata
- Class: Amphibia
- Order: Anura
- Family: Nyctibatrachidae
- Genus: Nyctibatrachus
- Species: N. petraeus

Binomial name
- Nyctibatrachus petraeus Das & Kunte, 2005

= Nyctibatrachus petraeus =

Species of frog

Nyctibatrachus petraeus is a species of frog in the family Nyctibatrachidae endemic to the Western Ghats, India. Its natural habitats are subtropical or tropical moist lowland forest and rivers. It is threatened by habitat loss.
