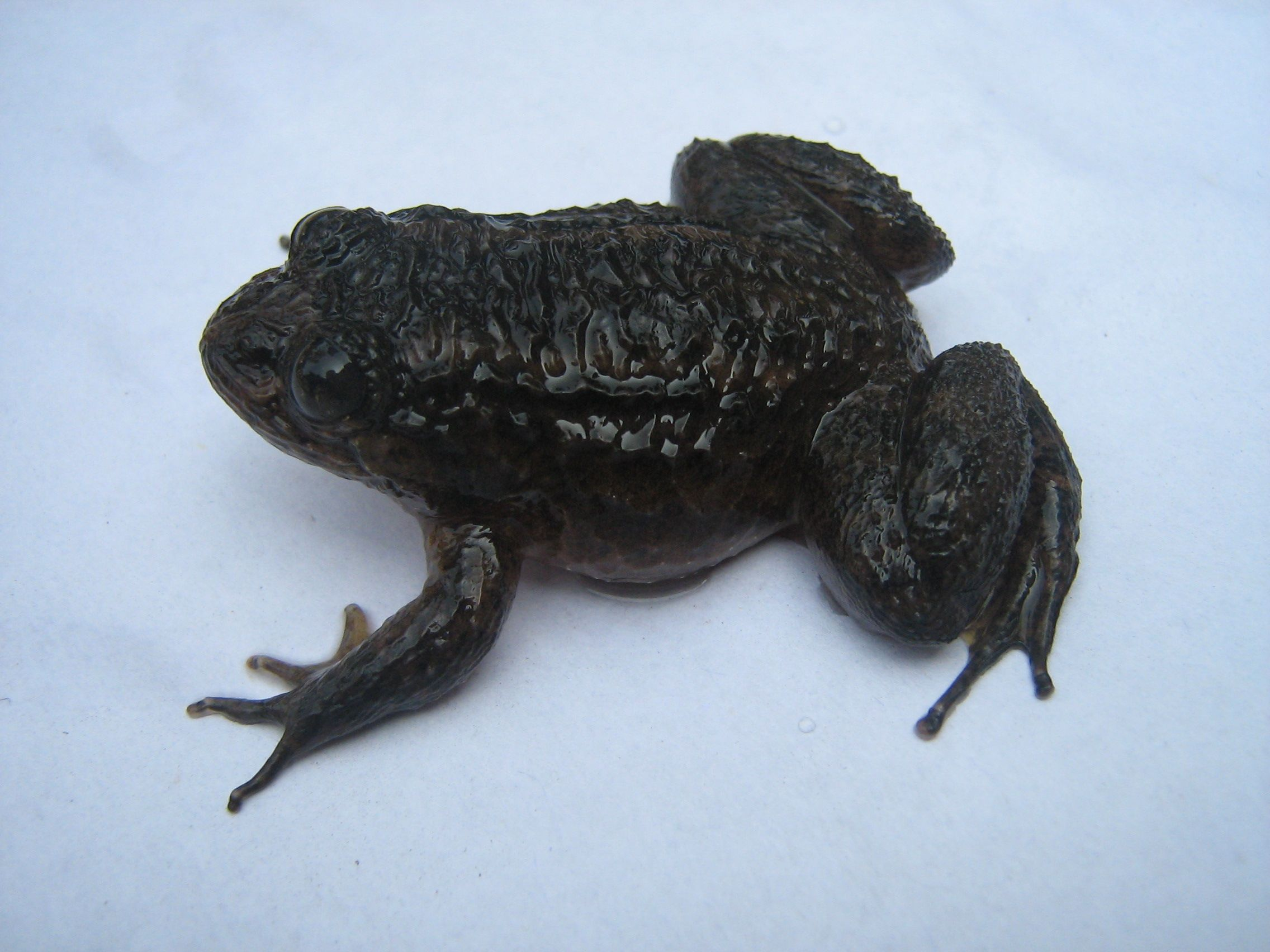

Conservation status
- Endangered (IUCN 3.1)

Scientific classification
- Kingdom: Animalia
- Phylum: Chordata
- Class: Amphibia
- Order: Anura
- Family: Nyctibatrachidae
- Genus: Nyctibatrachus
- Species: N. dattatreyaensis

Binomial name
- Nyctibatrachus dattatreyaensis Dinesh, Radhakrishnan & Bhatta, 2008

= Dattatreya night frog =

Species of amphibian

The Dattatreya night frog (Nyctibatrachus dattatreyaensis) is a species of frog in the family Nyctibatrachidae first described in the Shola forests around the Dattatreya Peeta in the Chikkamagaluru district of Karnataka. It is still known only from this part of the Western Ghats, India.

== Description ==
This species' head is wider than long; the skin on the dorsum is highly wrinkled with transverse corrugated folds - three discontinuous longitudinal folds, one dorsolaterally and two laterally; the webbing on toes is medium (three-quarters of the length); two yellowish bands occur on the dorsolateral area, prominent from subadult to adult stage; femoral glands are present. N. dattatreyaensis is a medium-sized (about 40 mm) frog active during night. The thumb pad and femoral glands are prominent in mature males. The eyes are golden yellow with black rhomboidal pupils. The upper surface of the body is reddish-black to stone black, with two yellow lateral bands. In day time, the frog prefers to hide below small boulders and damp leaf litter along the slow-flowing streams of the Shola forests in the hill ranges.

== Discovery ==
The frog was discovered in 2008 by scientists from Zoological Survey of India. It was named Nyctibatrachus dattatreyaensis, after the Dattatreya shrine in its habitat.

== Distribution ==
Nyctibatrachus dattatreyaensis is only known only from Dattatreya Peeta in the Bhadra Wildlife Sanctuary, Kemmangundi, and Baba Budangiri. All these sites are located in the Chikkamagaluru district, Karnataka, India.

== Conservation status and risks ==
The Chandra Drona Parvatha hill ranges are noted for medicinal herbs. Unauthorised collection of herbs is rampant. The area is under immense human pressure from ecotourism. The water source of the Manikyadhara Falls is endangered. Consequently, Nyctibatrachus dattatreyaensis is assessed as being "endangered".

== Diet ==
This species was found to be feeding majorly on Diptera species followed by Hymenoptera and Lepidoptera as prey.
