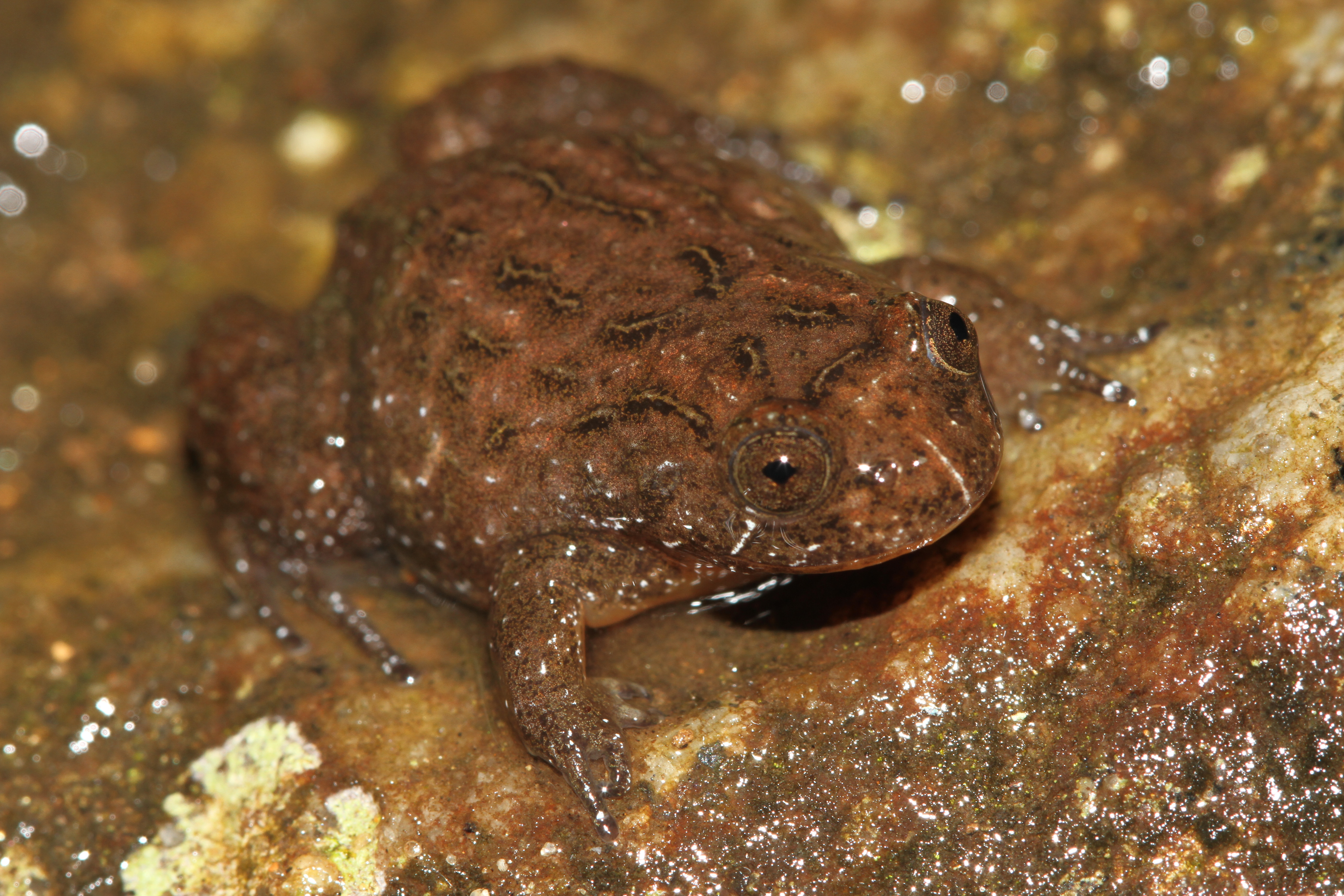

Conservation status
- Vulnerable (IUCN 3.1)

Scientific classification
- Kingdom: Animalia
- Phylum: Chordata
- Class: Amphibia
- Order: Anura
- Family: Nyctibatrachidae
- Genus: Nyctibatrachus
- Species: N. deccanensis

Binomial name
- Nyctibatrachus deccanensis Dubois, 1984

Synonyms
- Rana pygmaea Günther, 1876 "1875" — preoccupied by Rana pygmaea Spix, 1824; Nyctibatrachus pygmaeus (Günther, 1876); Nyctibatrachus sholai Radhakrishnan, Dinesh, and Ravichandran, 2007

= Nyctibatrachus deccanensis =

Species of frog

Nyctibatrachus deccanensis (common names: Deccan night frog, Deccan wrinkled frog) is a species of frogs in the family Nyctibatrachidae. It is endemic to the southern Western Ghats in Tamil Nadu and Kerala states, India. Its natural habitats are tropical moist lowland forests, moist montane forests, and rivers. It is threatened by habitat loss.

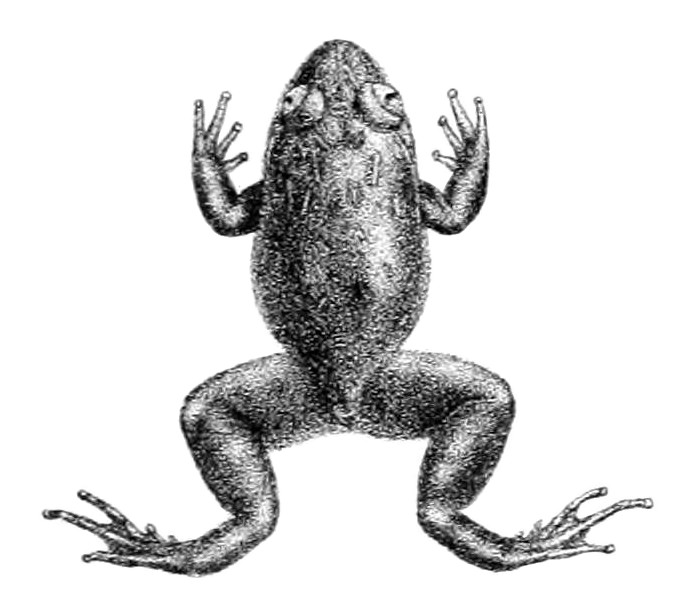
Illustration as Nyctibatrachus pygmaeus from George Albert Boulenger's Catalogue of the Batrachia Salientia s. Ecaudata in the collection of the British Museum published in 1882. This species was first described as Rana pygmaea by Albert Günther in 1876. Because that name is a homonym of Rana pygmaea Spix, 1824, replacement name was established in 1984.
