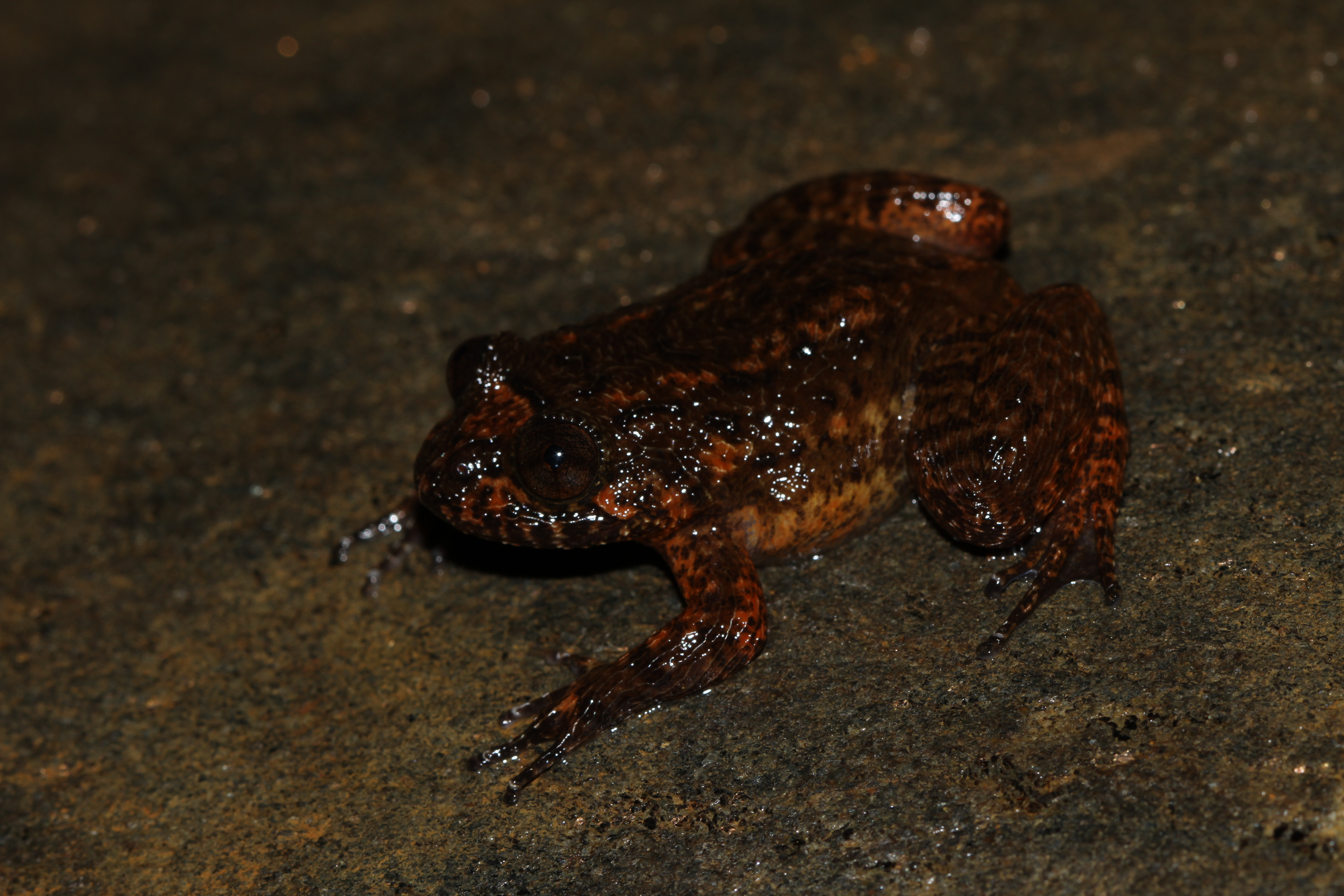

Conservation status
- Endangered (IUCN 3.1)

Scientific classification
- Kingdom: Animalia
- Phylum: Chordata
- Class: Amphibia
- Order: Anura
- Family: Nyctibatrachidae
- Genus: Nyctibatrachus
- Species: N. vasanthi

Binomial name
- Nyctibatrachus vasanthi Ravichandran, 1997

= Kalakad wrinkled frog =

Species of amphibian

The Kalakad wrinkled frog (Nyctibatrachus vasanthi) is a species of night frog in the family Nyctibatrachidae endemic to the Western Ghats, India. Its natural habitats are tropical moist lowland forests. It is threatened by habitat loss. Their diet predominantly consists of crustaceans.
