= S. A. Hussain =

Indian ornithologist

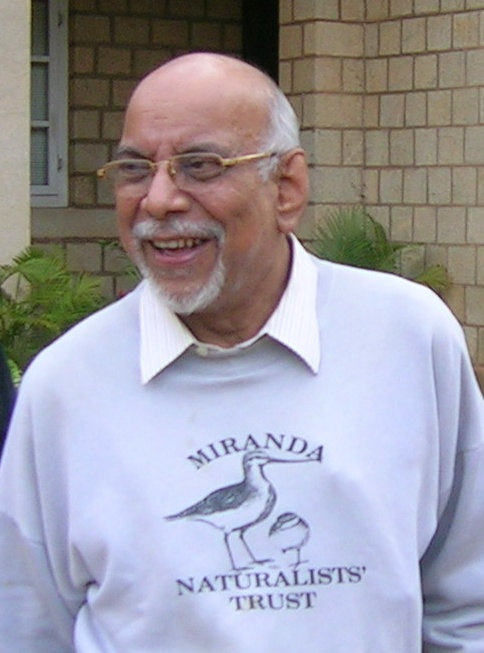
- Hussain in 2008
- Born: 13 August 1944; Karkala, near Mangalore
- Died: 30 December 2009 (aged 65); Karkala
- Citizenship: India
- Education: Sri Bhuvanendra College
- Scientific career
- Fields: Ornithology

Syed Abdulla Hussain (13 August 1944 – 30 December 2009) was an Indian ornithologist. He is best known for the work he undertook at the Bombay Natural History Society (BNHS) along with Salim Ali. A species of frog Nyctibatrachus hussaini from Kudremukh near his home, was named after him but the species name later became embroiled in controversy.

Hussain was born in Karkala, near Mangalore (then a part of the Madras Presidency) where his father Syed Hussain was a noted lawyer. His early education was at Basti Mission School and obtained a university degree in science from Sri Bhuvanendra College at Karkala. He applied for a field research position in the Bird Migration study project of the Bombay Natural History Society and although he had no formal education in zoology, Salim Ali found him very observant and accepted him. Hussain accompanied Ali on numerous expeditions and later conducted surveys on his own. Hussain became assistant curator of the BNHS in 1979, a senior scientist from 1985 to 1990 and then a deputy director of research until 1992. He later moved to Malaysia where he headed the Asian Wetland Bureau. He was also briefly the vice-chairman of BirdLife International. In 1974, he was part of a group that went in search of the forest owlet at a locality falsely claimed by Richard Meinertzhagen.

After retiring from work, he moved back to live in Karkala, where he started the Biodiversity Initiative Trust. The organization worked locally, particularly for conservation of the Kudremukh region. In 2003, he suggested a plan for the conversion of the Kudremukh Iron Ore Company township into a biodiversity research station as mining in this biodiversity hotspot had been stopped by the Indian government. He died of a heart attack at his home on 30 December 2009.

== Contributions to ornithology ==
Several of his early publications were based on studies of the bird collection at the BNHS. These include the extension in the range of Dinopium shorii in the Eastern Ghats, the validity of Otus bakkamoena stewarti, an extension of the range of Asian palm swift Cypsiurus parvus infumatus (north of the Brahmaputra river) In the course of his travels he noted several range extensions including the brown-winged kingfisher from Chilka, Cetti's warbler from Bharatpur, purple cochoa from Mussoorie (westernmost limit). His finding of the broad-tailed grassbird from Point Calimere opens up the possibility of the species in Sri Lanka, from where an old questionable specimen record exists. In 1972 he visited Narcondam Island to study the Narcondam hornbill, capturing two adult hornbills and their chicks. The two hornbill chicks were taken to Bombay, the male died on the ship journey while the female escaped in Madras, never to be found. The chicks lived for about 6 years, the female showed aggression to the male sibling and an injury to the male resulted in death. Based on his observations he suggested that the species was closer to Rhyticeros plicatus than to Rhyticeros undulatus. In the summer of 1977 he and Salim Ali, went to Bhutan to look for the yellow-rumped honeyguide. He noted the opportunistic behaviour of the honeyguides, making use of the attacks of Vespa mandarinia on the hives of Apis dorsata laboriosa. He also saw a honeyguide in the Valley of Flowers which he suggested should belong to the little-known subspecies radcliffi described by Allan Octavian Hume. He described a new subspecies of the bay owl Phodilus badius (P. b. ripleyi) in 1977. In 1983 he surveyed the black-necked crane in Ladakh. He published several observations made during ringing camps, particularly at Point Calimere. In 1992 he wrote about the distribution and status of the white-winged tit in Kutch.

In 1987, he coordinated the midwinter "Asian Waterfowl Census" conducted by volunteers across India. He produced an identification booklet with illustrations by Carl D'Silva to aid volunteers identify water birds.

A partial list of publications includes:

- Hussain, SA; Panday, JD; Shekar, PB (1976). "Extension of range of the Large Yellownaped Woodpecker (Picus flavinucha flavinucha Gould)". Journal of the Bombay Natural History Society. 73 (2): 394.
- Ripley, SD; Hussain, SA (1984). "Hypsipetes madagascariensis sinensis (La Touche)". Journal of the Bombay Natural History Society. 81 (1): 195–196.
- Abdulali, h; Hussain, SA (1971). "Occurrence of Eastern Ringed Plover Charadrius hiaticula tundrae (Lowe) in Tamil Nadu". Journal of the Bombay Natural History Society. 68 (2): 450–451.
- Abdulali, H; Hussain, SA (1971). "A second record of the migratory Jungle Nightjar (Caprimulgus indicus jotaka Temm. & Schl.) in Indian limits". Journal of the Bombay Natural History Society. 68 (2): 451–452.
- Abdulali, H; Hussain, SA (1971). "Extension of the breeding range of Sykes's Nightjar (Caprimulgus mahrattensis Sykes) in Indian limits". Journal of the Bombay Natural History Society. 68 (2): 452.
- Abdulali, H; Hussain, SA (1971). "Occurrence of the Long-eared Owl [Asio otus otus (Linnaeus)] in North Burma". Journal of the Bombay Natural History Society. 68 (2): 452–453.
- Abdulali, H; Hussain, SA (1972). "Occurrence of the Egyptian Nightjar Caprimulgus aegyptius aegyptius Lichtenstein in Baluchistan". Journal of the Bombay Natural History Society. 69 (1): 185–186.
- Hussain, SA; Balachandran, S (1993). "Recovery of Russian ringed Grey Plover (Pluvialis squatarola) at Point Calimere". Journal of the Bombay Natural History Society. 90 (3): 508–509.
- Balachandran, S; Hussain, SA (1994). "Longest longevity record for the Lesser Sandplover Charadrius mongolus Pallas". Journal of the Bombay Natural History Society. 91 (1): 140–141.
- Balachandran, S; Mohapatra, KK; Hussain, SA (1995). "Moult in three species of Bulbuls of the Genus Pycnonotus at Tirupati Hills of the Eastern Ghats, India". Journal of the Bombay Natural History Society. 92 (2): 151–159.
- Hussain, SA (1991). "I.C.B.P. National report – India". Newsletter for Birdwatchers. 31 (1&2): 2–6.
- Balachandran, S; Hussain, SA; Underhill, LG (2000). "Primary moult, biometrics, mass and age composition of Grey Plovers Pluvialis squatarola in southeastern India". Bird Study. 47: 82–90. doi:10.1080/00063650009461162.
- Hussain, SA (2002). "Sidney Dillon Ripley II 1913–2001". Ibis. 144 (3): 550. doi:10.1046/j.1474-919X.2002.00090_1.x.
