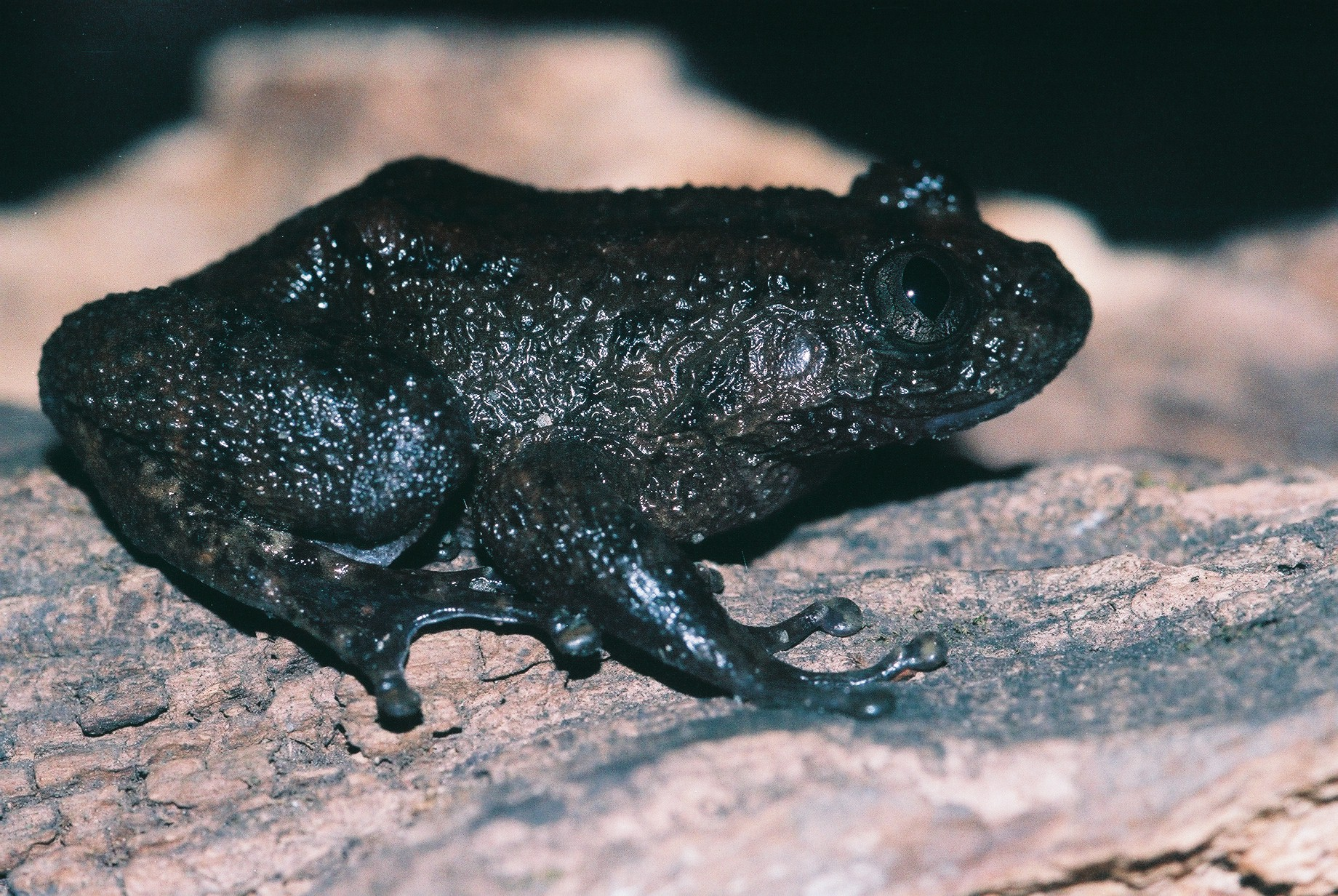
- Unidentified Nyctibatrachus from Phanasad Wildlife Sanctuary, Maharashtra

Scientific classification
- Kingdom: Animalia
- Phylum: Chordata
- Class: Amphibia
- Order: Anura
- Family: Nyctibatrachidae
- Subfamily: Nyctibatrachinae; Blommers-Schlösser, 1995
- Genus: Nyctibatrachus; Boulenger, 1882

Species
- See text

= Nyctibatrachus =

Genus of amphibians

Nyctibatrachus is a genus of frogs endemic to the Western Ghats of southwestern India. Their common name is night frogs. Their scientific name also means "night frog", in reference to their habits and dark color. They are the only extant members of the monotypic subfamily Nyctibatrachinae. Currently, 35 species belong to Nyctibatrachus.

== Description ==
Members of the genus Nyctibatrachus are robust-bodied frogs that range in size from small (snout–vent length <13 mm in Nyctibatrachus robinmoorei) to relatively large (up to 84 mm Nyctibatrachus karnatakaensis). The especially small species are among the smallest of all Indian frogs. They have a concealed tympanum, dorsum with longitudinal skin folds, femoral glands, and expanded finger and toes disks. They occur near streams in hilly evergreen forests and are nocturnal. Most species have amplexus but Nyctibatrachus humayuni does not; in this species the male moves over the eggs after the female has deposited them.

== Species ==
The following species are recognised in the genus Nyctibatrachus:

- Nyctibatrachus acanthodermis Biju et al., 2011 – spinular night frog
- Nyctibatrachus aliciae Inger, Shaffer, Koshy, and Bakde, 1984
- Nyctibatrachus anamallaiensis (Myers, 1942)
- Nyctibatrachus athirappillyensis Garg et al., 2017
- Nyctibatrachus beddomii (Boulenger, 1882)
- Nyctibatrachus danieli Biju et al., 2011
- Nyctibatrachus dattatreyaensis Dinesh, Radhakrishnan, and Bhatta, 2008
- Nyctibatrachus deccanensis Dubois, 1984
- Nyctibatrachus gavi Biju et al., 2011
- Nyctibatrachus grandis Biju et al., 2011
- Nyctibatrachus humayuni Bhaduri and Kripalani, 1955 – Bombay night frog
- Nyctibatrachus indraneili Biju et al., 2011
- Nyctibatrachus jog Biju et al., 2011 – Jog night frog
- Nyctibatrachus kali Aravind, Ramesh, Naik, Gururaja & Priti, 2026
- Nyctibatrachus karnatakaensis Dinesh, Radhakrishnan, Manjunatha Reddy, and Gururaja, 2007
- Nyctibatrachus kempholeyensis (Rao, 1937)
- Nyctibatrachus kumbara Gururaja, Dinesh, Priti, and Ravikanth, 2014
- Nyctibatrachus major Boulenger, 1882 – Malabar night frog
- Nyctibatrachus manalari Garg, 2017
- Nyctibatrachus mewasinghi Krutha, Dahanukar, and Molur, 2017
- Nyctibatrachus minimus Biju, Van Bocxlaer, Giri, Roelants, Nagaraju, and Bossuyt, 2007
- Nyctibatrachus minor Inger, Shaffer, Koshy, and Bakde, 1984
- Nyctibatrachus petraeus Das and Kunte, 2005
- Nyctibatrachus pillaii Biju et al., 2011
- Nyctibatrachus poocha Biju et al., 2011
- Nyctibatrachus pulivijayani Garg, 2017
- Nyctibatrachus radcliffei Garg, 2017
- Nyctibatrachus robinmoorei Garg, 2017
- Nyctibatrachus sabarimalai Garg, 2017
- Nyctibatrachus sanctipalustris Rao, 1920
- Nyctibatrachus shiradi Biju et al., 2011
- Nyctibatrachus sylvaticus Rao, 1937 – forest night frog
- Nyctibatrachus tunga Kumar, Vishwajith, Anish, Dayananda, Gururaja & Priti, 2022
- Nyctibatrachus vasanthi Ravichandran, 1997
- Nyctibatrachus vrijeuni Biju et al., 2011 – VUB night frog
- Nyctibatrachus webilla Garg, 2017
