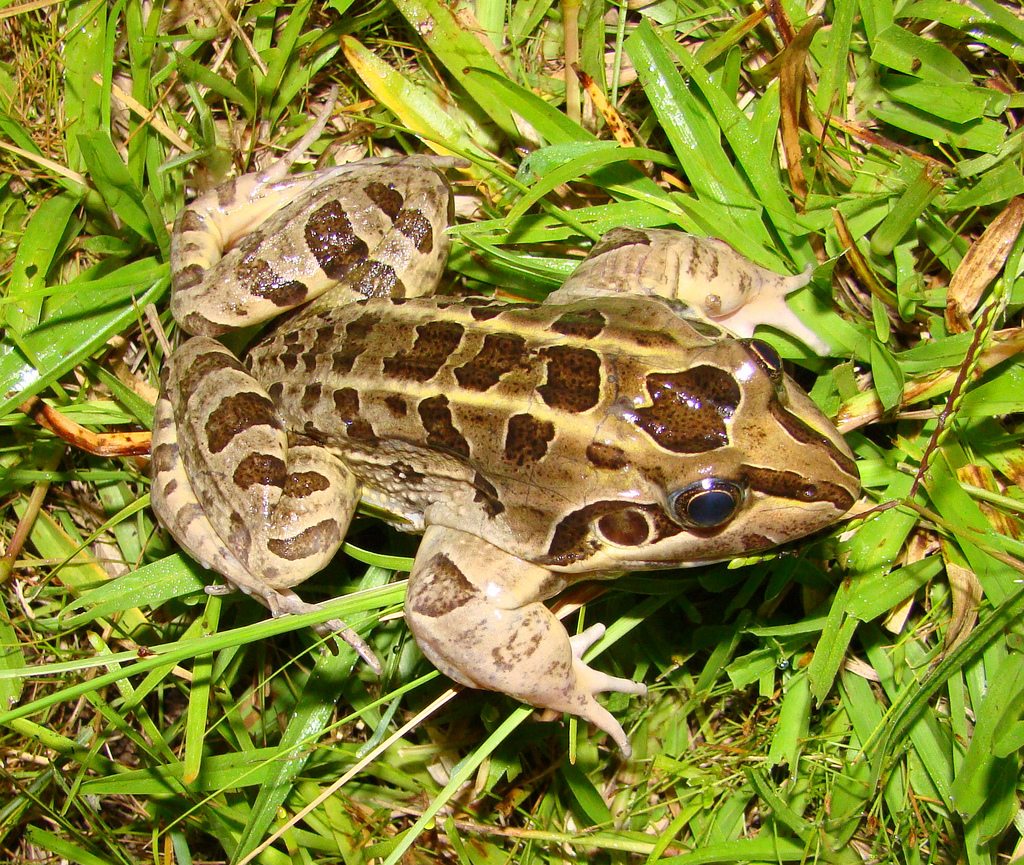

Conservation status
- Least Concern (IUCN 3.1)

Scientific classification
- Kingdom: Animalia
- Phylum: Chordata
- Class: Amphibia
- Order: Anura
- Family: Leptodactylidae
- Genus: Leptodactylus
- Species: L. latrans

Binomial name
- Leptodactylus latrans (Steffen, 1815)

Synonyms
- Leptodactylus ocellatus auct. non (Linnaeus, 1758); Rana gibbosa Raddi, 1823; Rana fusca Raddi, 1823; Rana pygmaea Spix, 1824; Rana pachypus Spix, 1824; Rana pachybrachion Wied-Neuwied, 1824; Rana macrocephala Wied-Neuwied, 1825; Leptodactylus serialis Girard, 1853; Leptodactylus caliginosus Girard, 1853; Rana luctator Hudson, 1892; Rana octoplicata Werner, 1893; Cystignathus oxycephalus Philippi, 1902; Leptodactylus macrosternum Miranda-Ribero, 1926; Leptodactylus pygmaeus Miranda-Ribeiro, 1927

= Leptodactylus latrans =

Species of frog

Leptodactylus latrans is a species of frog in the family Leptodactylidae. It is native to much of South America east of the Andes, and Trinidad and Tobago. It has many common names, including rana criolla, sapo-rana llanero, butter frog, argus frog, and lesser foam frog.

== Description ==
The adult male frog measures 90-120 mm in snout-vent length and the adult female frog is 80-110 mm. The skin of the dorsum is dark gray or red-brown in color with folded skin. There are dark ocelli spots with white around the edges, resembling eyes. The male frog has robust front legs. This frog has only fringed skin on its feet rather than full webbing, so it can swim well but also jump and move effectively on land.

The adult frog can alter the length of its gut. The male frogs have longer guts during the warm part of the year when food is most abundant, and female frogs have longer guts during the cold part of the year when they develop eggs.

== Habitat and ecology ==
This is a common species in many parts of its range. It can be found in a variety of habitat types, including swamps, savannah, grasslands, and tropical forest ecosystems. It tolerates disturbed habitat and can be seen in gardens and urban areas. It breeds in temporary water bodies, such as ponds and floodplains, where it creates a foam nest for its eggs. In some cases, one parent, usually a female, guards the tadpoles and attacks potential predators. This frog has been observed between 0 and 900 meters above sea level, and in many protected areas throughout its range.

== Relationship to humans ==
People sometimes eat this frog.

== Reproduction ==
The male frog hides in aquatic plants and calls to the female frogs. The female frogs usually lay eggs in temporary ponds. She lays the eggs in a foam nest that the male frog makes while still in amplexus. The bubble nest and the eggs inside it float on top of the water. Each nest is 12-25 cm long and has thousands to eggs in it. It has a hole in the middle that is 4-8 cm long. The female frog sometimes sits in the hole in the nest so she can scare away animals that want to eat the eggs, for example birds. Sometimes the adult frogs lay eggs on dry land before the rain. Then the rain turns the land into a pond. The tadpoles leave the nest and swim in the pond. Because they hatch before the pond is there, these tadpoles are bigger and stronger than the tadpoles of frog species that lay eggs after it rains. The tadpoles exhibit school ing behavior.

== Taxonomy ==
This taxon is considered to be a species complex, or a component of one, and taxonomic studies may distinguish several different species among its populations.
