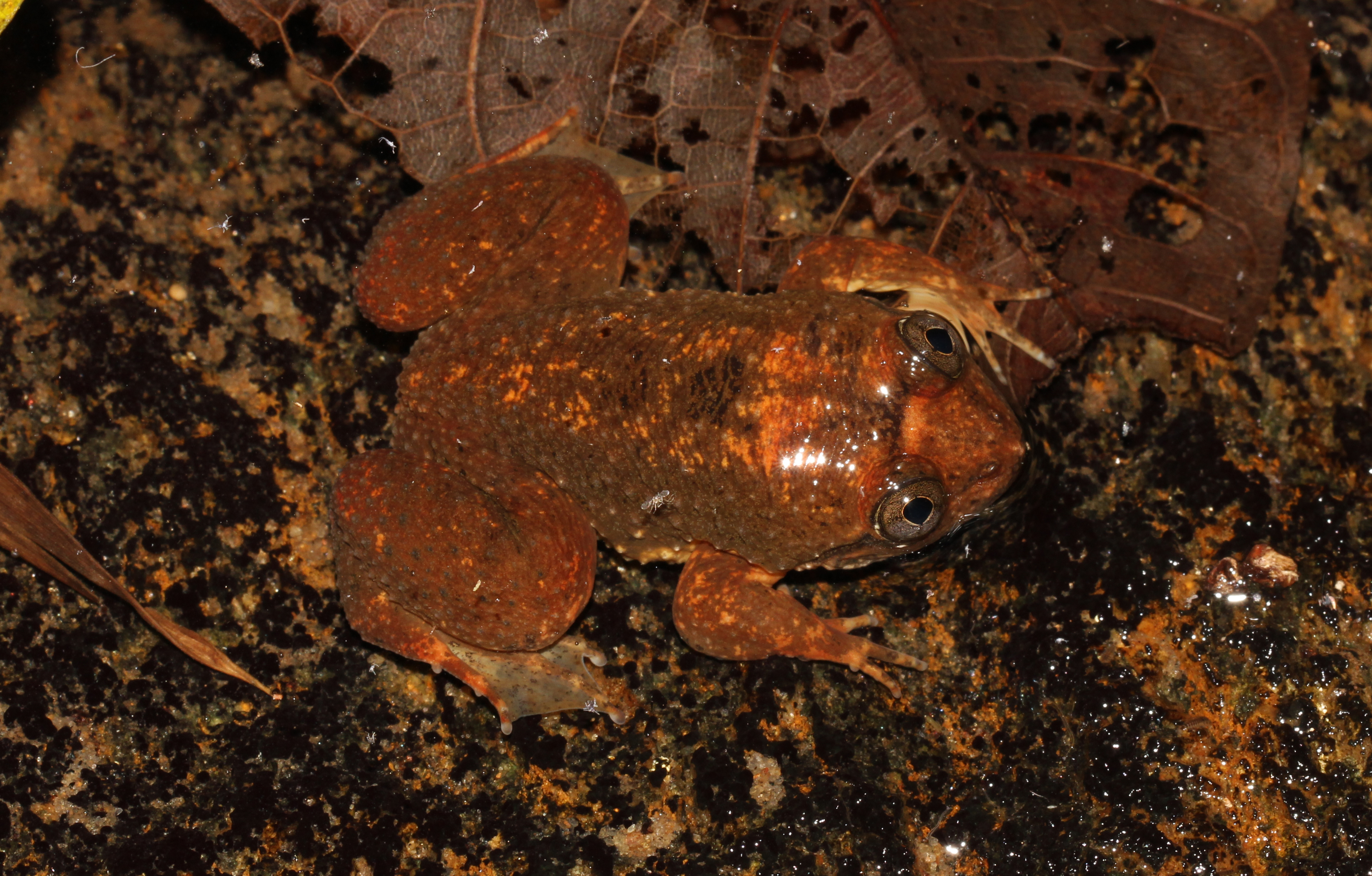

Scientific classification
- Kingdom: Animalia
- Phylum: Chordata
- Class: Amphibia
- Order: Anura
- Family: Nyctibatrachidae
- Subfamily: Lankanectinae; Dubois & Ohler, 2001
- Genus: Lankanectes; Dubois & Ohler, 2001

Species
- Lankanectes corrugatus; Lankanectes pera

= Lankanectes =

Genus of amphibians

Lankanectes is a genus of frogs in the family Nyctibatrachidae that is endemic to Sri Lanka. It is the only member of the Nyctibatrachidae to be found outside India and the only member of the subfamily Lankanectinae.

There are two known species in this genus:

- Lankanectes corrugatus (Peters, 1863)
- Lankanectes pera (Senevirathne et al, 2018)
