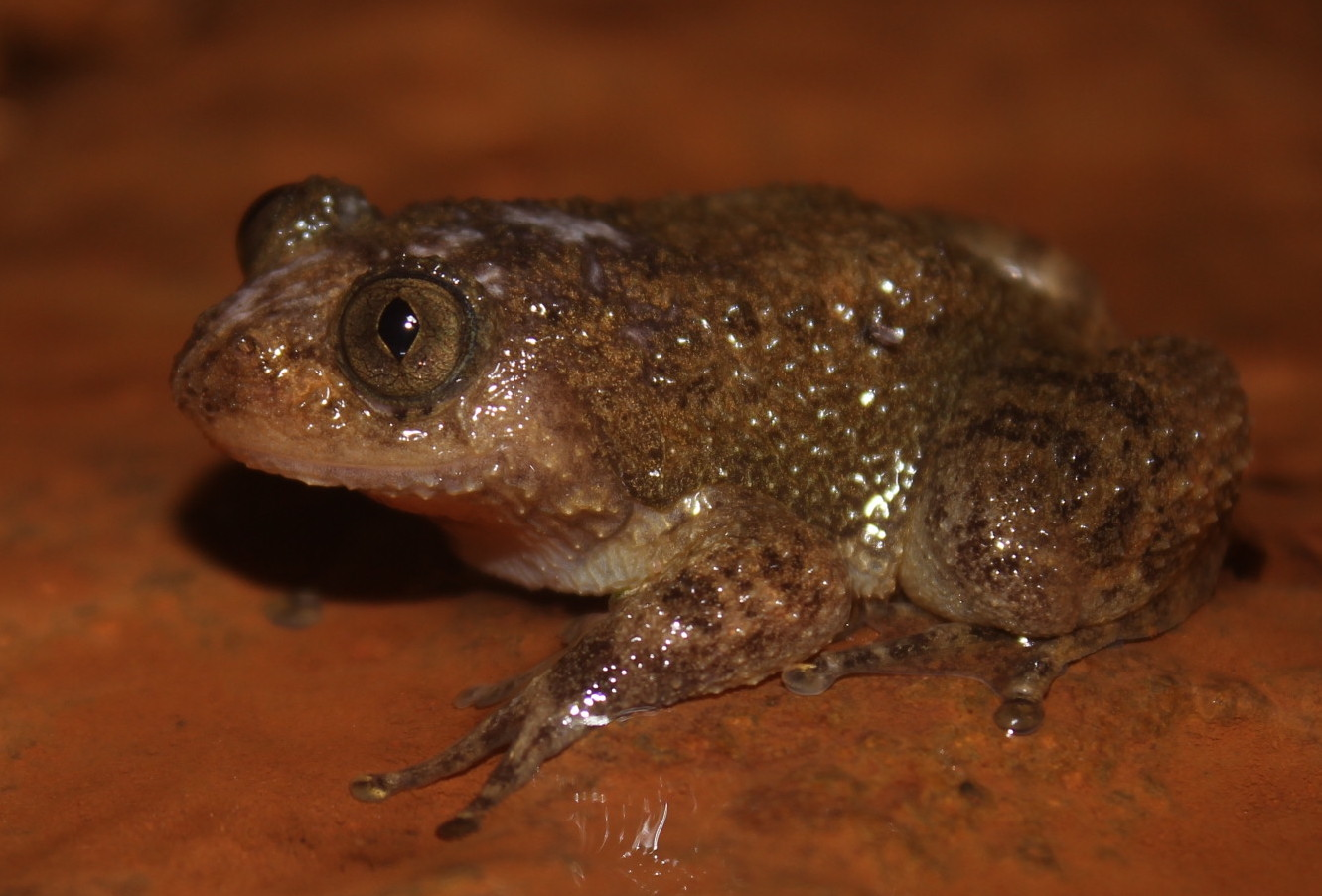

Conservation status
- Vulnerable (IUCN 3.1)

Scientific classification
- Kingdom: Animalia
- Phylum: Chordata
- Class: Amphibia
- Order: Anura
- Family: Nyctibatrachidae
- Genus: Nyctibatrachus
- Species: N. humayuni

Binomial name
- Nyctibatrachus humayuni Bhaduri & Kripalani, 1955

= Bombay night frog =

Species of amphibian

The Bombay night frog (Nyctibatrachus humayuni), also known as Abdulali's wrinkled frog, Abdulali's night frog or Humayun's wrinkled frog, is a species of frog in the family Nyctibatrachidae. It is endemic to the Western Ghats of Maharashtra state, India. The species is found near torrential hill streams in tropical moist evergreen and semi-evergreen forests, a habitat that is threatened by habitat loss and pollution. Its name honours Humayun Abdulali, an Indian biologist.

== Description ==
N. humayuni is a plump frog with prominent, forward-facing eyes with vertically slit pupils, a wide head, and rounded snout. The fore limbs are short and plump, and the flattened fingers have large discs on the tips. The hind limbs are rather longer, the toe pads are also disc-shaped, and the toes are fully webbed. It grows to a length of about 48 mm (1.9 in), the back is a mottled dark grey or brown, the belly is paler grey, and the limbs sometimes have dark bands. The male has orange glands on his thighs and has no vocal sac.

== Distribution and habitat ==
N. humayuni is found in the Indian state of Maharashtra, in the Western Ghats, and in Goa and Karnataka states at elevations of 200 to 1,200 m (660 to 3,940 ft) above sea level. Part of its range is in the Bhimashankar Wildlife Sanctuary and the Koyna Wildlife Sanctuary. It lives in or near fast-flowing, rocky, mountain streams where it hides under rocks and in crevices. It favours forested areas with dense vegetation hanging over the water, and is sometimes found at forest edges away from streams. It has been found in a large cave near Mahabaleshwar, occupying a cave ecosystem alongside Beddome's leaping frog (Indirana beddomii). The cave has a stream flowing through it, and the numerous fulvous fruit bats (Rousettus leschenaulti) that roost there have created a deep bed of bat droppings, which is inhabited by many invertebrates on which the frogs feed.

== Reproduction ==
Breeding takes place during the monsoon season between May and September. The male maintains a territory, positioning himself on a twig or leaf overhanging a stream and calling repeatedly. The female arrives in response to these calls and deposits a small clutch of eggs on the exact spot from which the male was calling. She then returns to the stream and he stands over the eggs and fertilizes them. He then moves to a new position with potential for egg deposition a few centimetres (inches) away and starts making his advertisement call again to attract another female. In this way, the male decides where the eggs are to be laid. This is the only known Old World frog species where the male and female do not engage in amplexus, the mating behaviour in which the male frog grasps the female round the body and fertilizes the eggs as they are laid. After 12 to 15 days, the developing tadpoles emerge from the jelly-clad eggs and drop into the stream below, where they continue their development.

== Status ==
Although locally common, the number of Nyctibatrachus humayuni frogs is declining slowly. The species is listed as "Vulnerable" in the IUCN Red List of Threatened Species because its range is fragmented and amounts to a total area smaller than 20,000 km^{2} (7,700 sq mi). Its habitat is being degraded by deforestation, agricultural activities, pollution, and disturbance by humans.
