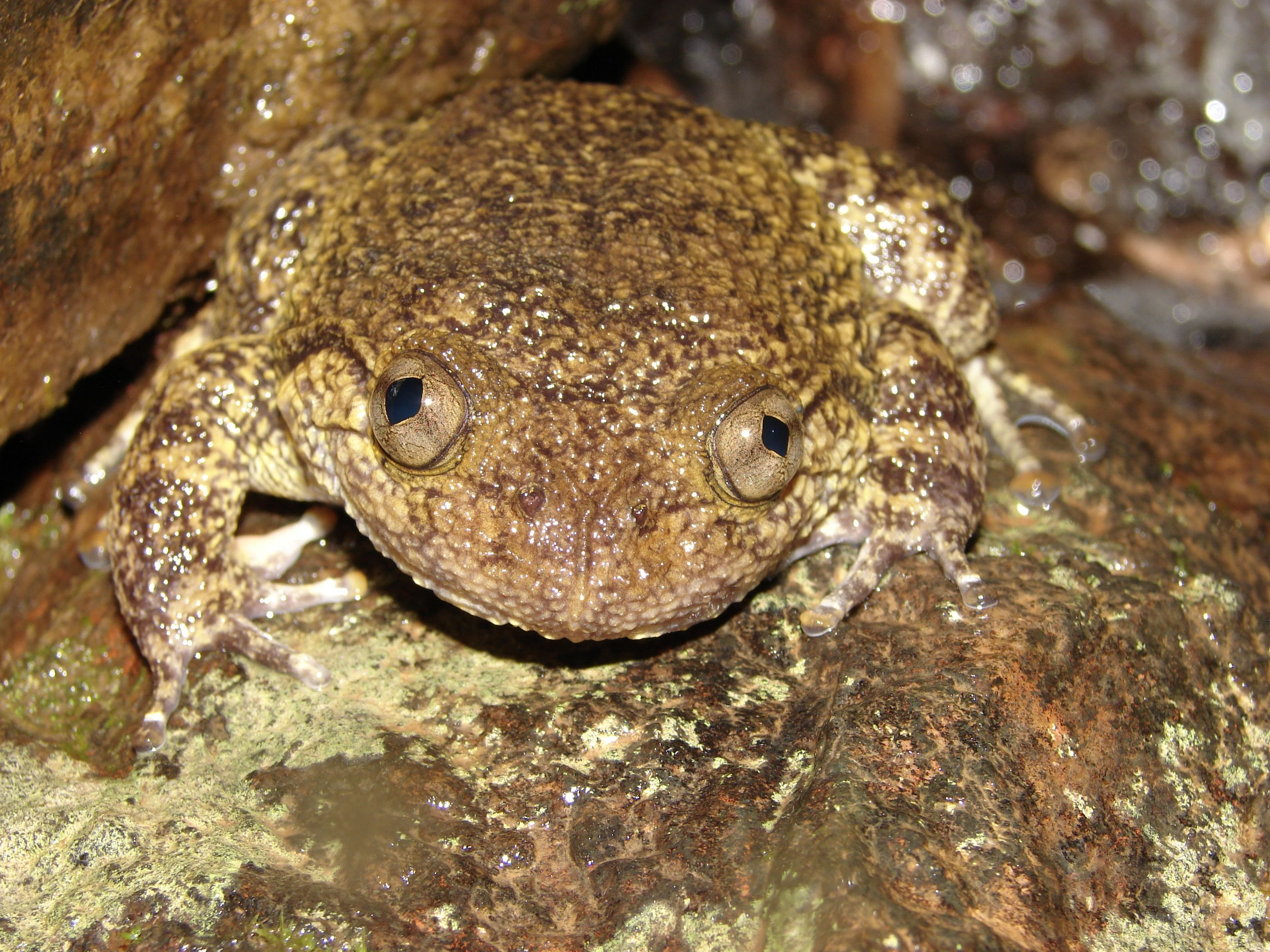

Conservation status
- Endangered (IUCN 3.1)

Scientific classification
- Kingdom: Animalia
- Phylum: Chordata
- Class: Amphibia
- Order: Anura
- Family: Nyctibatrachidae
- Genus: Nyctibatrachus
- Species: N. karnatakaensis

Binomial name
- Nyctibatrachus karnatakaensis Dinesh, Radhakrishnan, Reddy & Gururaja, 2007

Synonyms
- Nyctibatrachus hussaini Krishnamurthy, Reddy & Gururaja, 2001

= Giant wrinkled frog =

Species of amphibian

The giant wrinkled frog (Nyctibatrachus karnatakaensis, arguably a junior synonym of N. hussaini) is a species of frogs in the family Nyctibatrachidae endemic to the Western Ghats of India in the Kudremukh region. Its natural habitats are tropical moist lowland forests and rivers. It is threatened by habitat loss.

== Taxonomic controversy ==
This "species" was named after the Indian ornithologist S. A. Hussain as Nyctibatrachus hussaini. In 2001, Biju questioned the validity of this species due to lack of type specimens in the museum.

In 2007, some of the same authors suggested the alternative name of Nyctibatrachus karnatakaensis, stating that Nyctibatrachus hussaini was invalid due to the lack of a traceable holotype, though two of the authors claiming this were responsible for the original description. A holotype (more correctly a neotype) was designated and vouchered at the Zoological Survey of India in Kozhikode with the alternate name. This became the subject of considerable controversy, as problems were noted in peer-review practices and adherence to the ICZN code.
