= C. R. Narayan Rao =

Indian zoologist

C.R. Narayan Rao
- Born: 15 August 1882; Coimbatore, India
- Died: 2 January 1960 (aged 77); Bangalore, India
- Occupation: Scientist

C.R. Narayan Rao (15 August 1882 – 2 January 1960) was an Indian zoologist and herpetologist. He was among the founding editors of the journal Current Science. In recognition of his pioneering work on Indian amphibians, the genus Raorchestes was named after him.

== Background ==
Born in Coimbatore, he studied in Bellary and at the Madras Christian College under Professor Henderson who headed the department of zoology. After obtaining his graduate and post-graduate degrees and a gold medal for proficiency, he obtained a diploma in teaching. He taught in Coimbatore and Ernakulam, before moving to the Central College in Bangalore where he organized the department of zoology and headed it until his retirement in 1937.

== Contributions ==
His role in science and research is considered significant since he was involved in the integration of research into university education. Along with Sir Martin Onslow Forster and other Indian scientists he helped found the journal Current Science in July 1932 along the lines of the journal Nature. He was its first editor. In one of his first editorials, he pleaded for the coordination of scientific activities in India, a plea that helped create the Indian Academy of Sciences.

Professor Rao specialized on frogs and their taxonomy. He named and described several frog species, and his work on the Archenteric and Segmentation Cavities of frogs are regarded as important contributions to our understanding of amphibian development. He described the new Microhylid genus Ramanella. The genus Raorchestes is named in his honour.

Professor Rao presided over the zoology section of the Indian Science Congress in 1938 at Lahore. His account of the ovarian ovum of the slender loris was presented to the Royal Society by James Peter Hill in the latter's Croonian Lecture.

== Bibliography ==
- Notes on some south Indian Batrachia. Records of the Indian Museum XII (1915)
- Notes on the tadpoles of Indian Engystomatidae. Records of the Indian Museum XV (1918)
- Some new species of cyprinoid fish from Mysore. Annals and Magazine of Natural History (1920)
- On the structure of the ovary and ovarian ovum of Loris lydekkerianus. Quarterly Journal of Microscopic Science LXXI (1927)
- Notes on the fresh water-fish of Mysore. Journal of Mysore University I (with Seshachar B. R., 1927)
- Observations on the habits of the slow loris, Loris lydekkerianus. Journal of Bombay Natural History Society XXXII (1932)
- Tadpoles of a genus not recorded from India. Current Science 6(9):455–456. (1938)
