= Sathyabhama Das Biju =

Indian herpetologist and conservationist

Sathyabhama Das Biju (SD Biju)
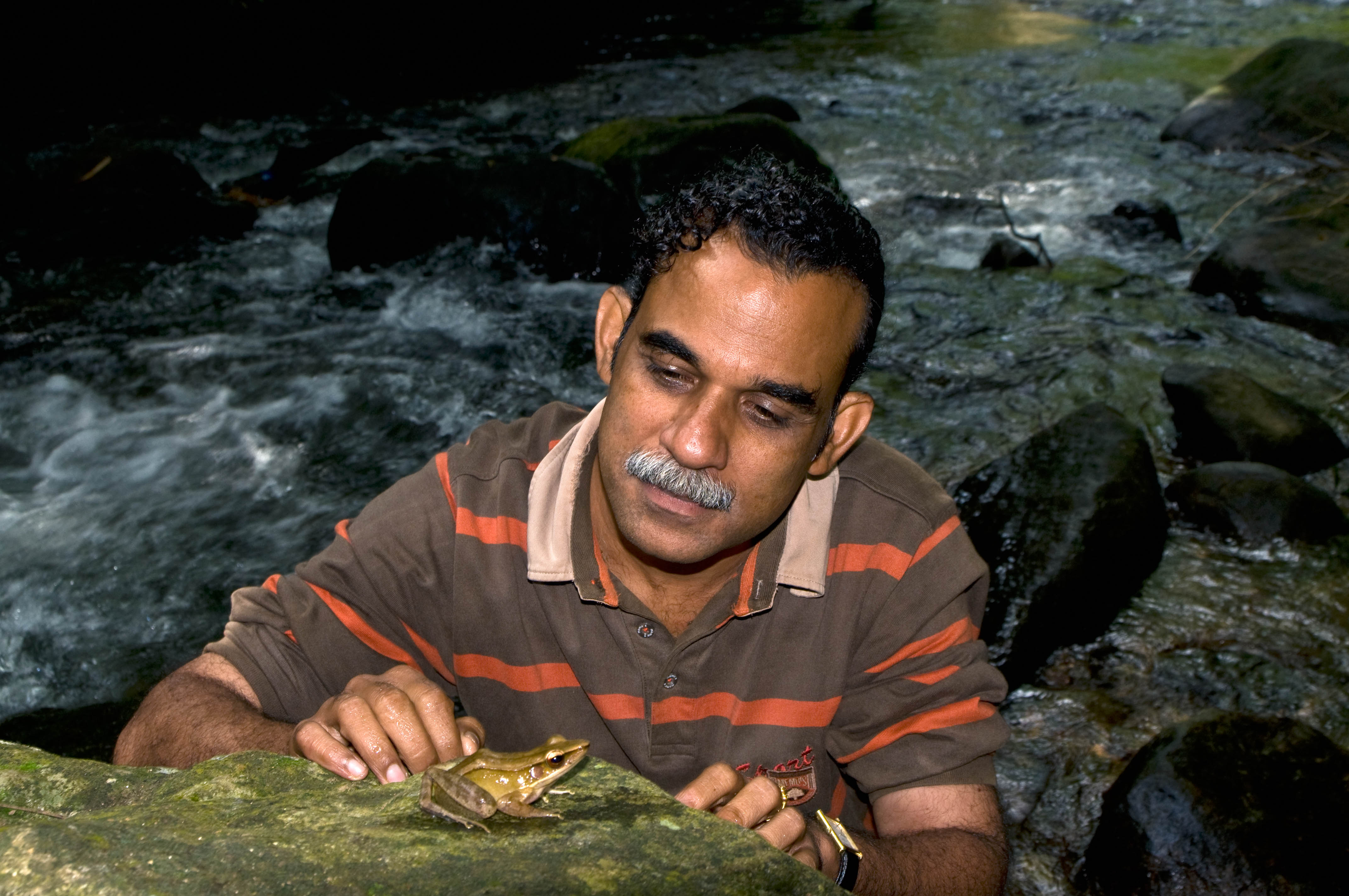
- Born: May 1963 (age 63); Kadakkal, Kerala, India
- Education: PhD (Animal Biology), 2007, Vrije Universiteit Brussel, Brussels; PhD (Plant Systematics), 1999, University of Calicut, Kerala; MSc, 1987, University of Kerala, Kerala
- Occupations: Biologist, conservationist, herpetologist
- Employer: University of Delhi
- Known for: Amphibian research and conservation
- Awards: Kerala Sree 2022, Sanctuary Wildlife Service Award 2011, IUCN Sabin Award for Amphibian Conservation 2008

Sathyabhama Das Biju (born May, 1963) is an Indian amphibian biologist and wildlife conservationist. He heads the Systematics Lab at the University of Delhi, Department of Environmental Studies and is currently in Harvard University as a Radcliffe Fellow at the Radcliffe Institute for Advanced Study. He is dubbed as the "Frogman of India" by media for his passion for frogs and for bringing fresh fascination for Indian amphibians. Biju completed his degrees from Kerala University and obtained his first PhD was in Botany from University of Calicut, India. He contributed to knowledge on plants through several scientific publications and books. His second PhD was in animal science from Vrije Universiteit Brussel, Belgium.

In 2010, Biju in collaboration with national and international institutions launched the nationwide Lost! Amphibians of India campaign to rediscover species thought to be extinct. In 2011, Biju was the recipient of the Sanctuary Wildlife Service Award for his "extraordinary passion which led to the discovery of several new species". In 2008, the IUCN recognized his "extreme dedication to discover and conserve the vanishing amphibian fauna" by conferring him the Sabin Award. In 2006, he established the Systematics Lab at the University of Delhi to bring together and train young researchers in the field of herpetology. Currently, Biju is a Senior Professor at the Department of Environmental Studies University of Delhi. He is also an Associate of the Department of Organismic and Evolutionary Biology (OEB) and the Museum of Comparative Zoology at Harvard University. In 2022, he was honoured with Kerala Sree Award, third highest civilian award given by the Government of Kerala. A Radcliffe Hrdy fellow, Biju has also served as the Dean, Faculty of Science and Head, Department of Environmental Studies at University of Delhi. He was also a recipient of the INSA-Royal Society London Exchange Fellowship and The Royal Society London Fellowship for working at the British Museum of Natural History, London. He has been elected Fellow of the Indian National Science Academy (INSA), the Indian Academy of Sciences (IASc) and the National Academy of Sciences (NASI).

== Early life ==
Sathyabhama Das Biju was born in May 1963 and was raised in rural Kerala in the town of Kadakkal, Kollam. Biju did not receive a proper formal school education. He completed his master's degree in Botany from Kerala University in 1987 and obtained his first PhD in Plant Systematics in 1999 from Calicut University. During 1992 to 2003 he was a scientist at the Jawaharlal Nehru Tropical Botanical Garden and Research Institute (formerly Tropical Botanical Garden and Research Institute) (TBGRI), and during his brief stint as a plant systematist, he published seven new plant species, resolved long-standing taxonomic and systematic problems of plants belonging to the families Convolvulaceae and Rubiaceae, besides publishing several research articles and books on plants.

== Amphibian research ==
Biju became increasingly fascinated with frogs that he encountered during the several field expeditions he conducted in the Western Ghats in search of plants. To be able to fully explore the world of amphibians Biju eventually quit his research in plant science in 2000 and joined Franky Bossuyt at the Amphibian Evolution Lab, Vrije Universiteit Brussel and obtained his second PhD, this time in Amphibian Systematics. In less than a decade of his professional career as an amphibian systematist, Biju's efforts have already thrown up over 100 new species and formally described 96 new species, eight new genera and two new families of amphibians. Remarkable among his discoveries are the entirely new and famed purple frog family Nasikabatrachidae from the Western Ghats of India, published in the journal Nature. This discovery was heralded as a once-in-a-century find because the last time a new family of amphibians was described was almost 100 years ago. His second discovery of a new amphibian family was in 2012, the Chikilidae, popularly called tailless burrowing caecilians or chikilids, published in the journal Proceedings of the Royal Society, Series B. This discovery was called the 'discovery of the year' and 'another giant scientific discovery'. Both these discoveries of ancient lineages (both the families about 140 million years old) shed significant light on the biogeographic history of the Earth, particularly that of the Gondwana, and in understanding the present-day continental distribution patterns of organisms–while the closest relatives of the purple frog lives 3,000 km across the Indian Ocean in the Seychelles, that of the chikilids is found 7,000 km in Africa. Notable among his new species discoveries are India's first canopy frog Raorchestes nerostgona; India's smallest tetrapod Nyctibatrachus minimus, a frog whose adults do not grow more than 10 mm; and Nasikabatrachus sahyadrensis, the famed purple frog.

A critical aspect of Biju's work has been the combination of molecular techniques with traditional approaches bringing on par with the international practice in amphibian research. His efforts have resolved long-standing taxonomic and systematic problems and confusions in difficult amphibian groups: the bush frogs Philautus and night frogs Nyctibatrachus. In recognition of his outstanding contribution to India's modern amphibian systematics, scientists named a frog after him Polypedates bijui. Biju's tireless endeavor brought the Indian amphibians into global limelight. The world was taken by surprise to see a frog featured on the cover of a largely macro-economics and business magazine, The Economist, London.

== Conservation career ==
Biju's conservation concern for the rapidly vanishing amphibians, incidentally the world's most threatened vertebrate group led to the creation of two important conservation initiatives in India. The Western Ghats Network of Protected Areas of Threatened Amphibians (WNPATA), a network for individuals and institutions working on amphibians in the Western Ghats. In collaboration with national and international institutions and individuals, Biju launched a unique nationwide campaign called the Lost Amphibians of India (LAI) to rediscover 'lost' species that have not been sighted in life for as long as two centuries since they were originally discovered and described. The unique feature of LAI is the involvement of civil society including students, members of NGOs, and other non-amphibian specialists in conservation initiatives and has huge implications on the conservation of amphibians. LAI has over 600 team members and has conducted about 42 field expeditions.

== Publications ==
Biju has extensively published in high impact factor and prestigious journals such as Nature, Science, Zoological Journal of the Linnean Society, Proceedings of the National Academy of Sciences, Proceedings of the Royal Society, and has written books on both plants and amphibians.

== Awards ==
1. Sanctuary Wildlife Service Award (2011)
2. IUCN Sabin Award (2008)
3. Kerala Sree Award (2022)

== See also ==
- List of herpetologists
