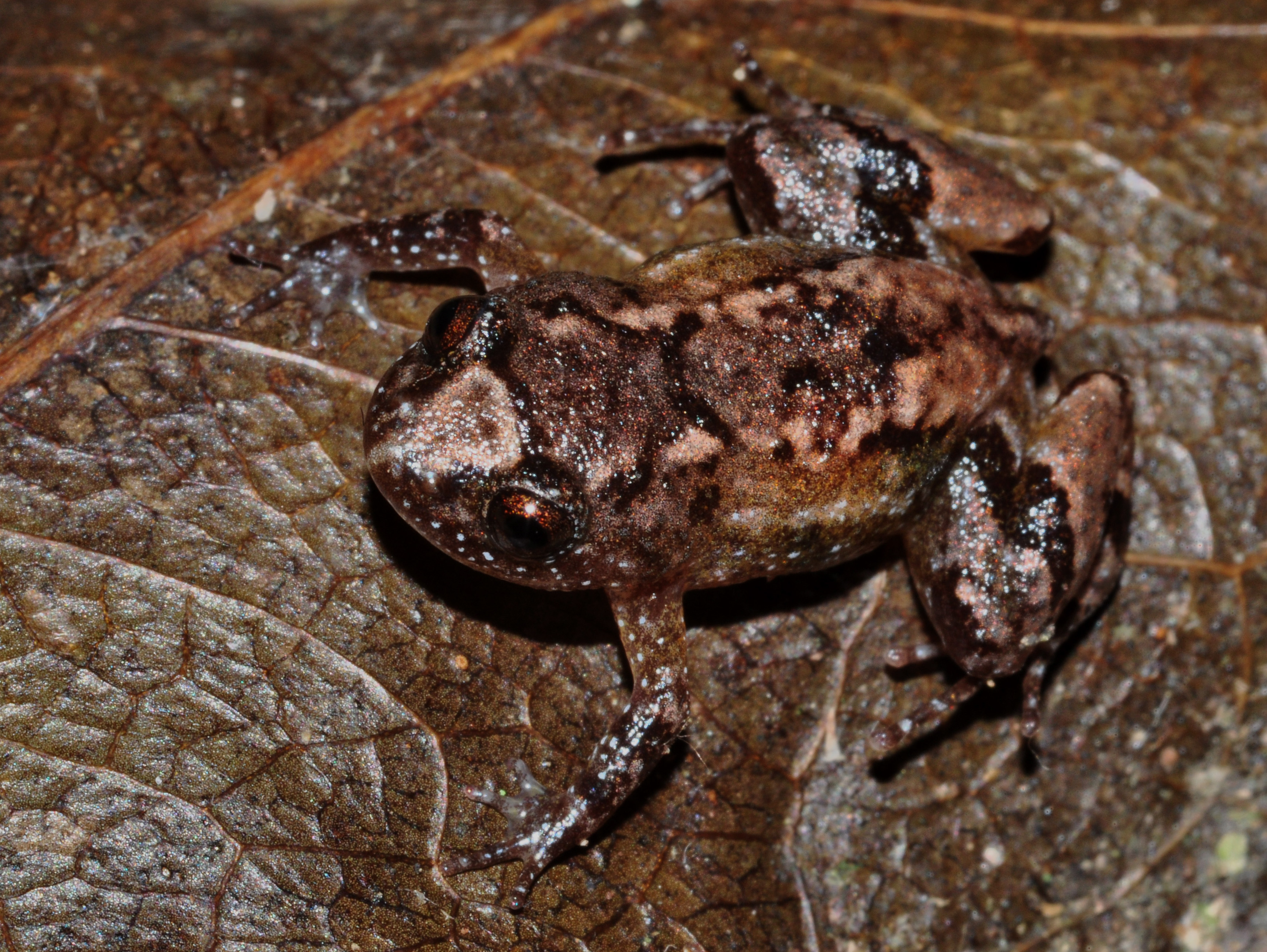
- Nyctibatrachus beddomii

Scientific classification
- Kingdom: Animalia
- Phylum: Chordata
- Class: Amphibia
- Order: Anura
- Superfamily: Ranoidea
- Family: Nyctibatrachidae; Blommers-Schlösser, 1993

Type genus
- Nyctibatrachus Boulenger, 1882

= Nyctibatrachidae =

Family of amphibians

Nyctibatrachidae is a small family of frogs found in the Western Ghats of India and in Sri Lanka. Their common name is robust frogs. Recognition of Nyctibatrachidae as a family is fairly recent. These frogs were previously placed in the broadly defined family Ranidae, which was more recently divided into three subfamilies: Lankanectinae, Nyctibatrachinae, and Astrobatrachinae.

== Genera ==
The family contains three genera in their own subfamilies:

- Subfamily Astrobatrachinae
  - Astrobatrachus Vijayakumar et al., 2019 (Western Ghats of southwestern India – 1 species)
- Subfamily Lankanectinae
  - Lankanectes Dubois and Ohler, 2001 (Sri Lanka – 2 species)
- Subfamily Nyctibatrachinae
  - Nyctibatrachus Boulenger, 1882 (Western Ghats of southwestern India – 28 species)

== Description ==
Nyctibatrachus are robust-bodied frogs that range in size from small (snout–vent length <20 mm in Nyctibatrachus beddomii) to relatively large (up to 84 mm Nyctibatrachus karnatakaensis). They occur in near streams in hilly evergreen forests. Lankanectes is an aquatic species of slow-moving rivers in marshy areas.
