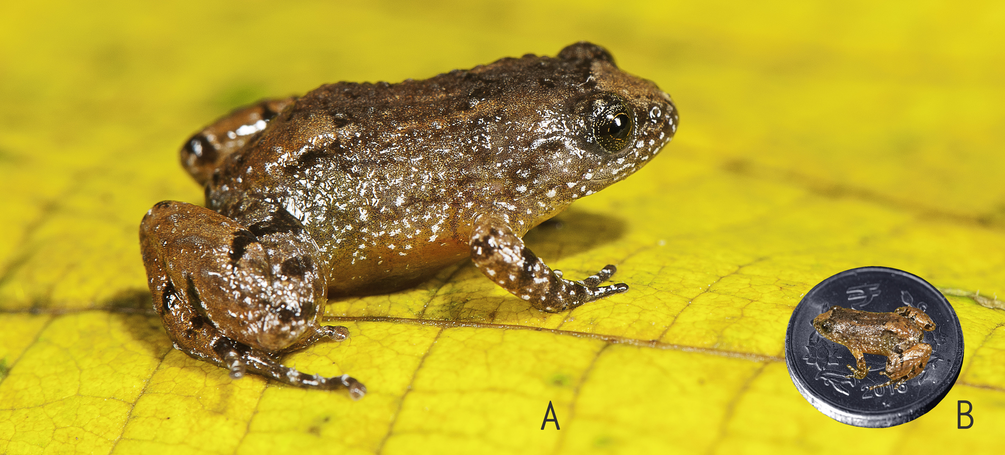
- N. manalari, with Indian five-rupee coin for scale

Conservation status
- Data Deficient (IUCN 3.1)

Scientific classification
- Kingdom: Animalia
- Phylum: Chordata
- Class: Amphibia
- Order: Anura
- Family: Nyctibatrachidae
- Genus: Nyctibatrachus
- Species: N. manalari

Binomial name
- Nyctibatrachus manalari Garg, Suyesh, Sukesan, and Biju, 2017
- N. manalari is only known from the Western Ghats in southern India

= Nyctibatrachus manalari =

Species of frog

Nyctibatrachus manalari, the Manalar night frog, is a species of frog in the robust frog family Nyctibatrachidae. It was described in 2017, along with six other species in its genus, by the herpetologist Sonali Garg and her colleagues. A small frog, it has an adult male snout–vent length of 13.1–15.4 mm (0.52–0.61 in). It is mainly reddish-brown in color, with a pale patch on the snout, lighter undersides, and dark brown horizontal lines on the limbs. When preserved in ethanol, it is mostly grey to greyish-brown, with grayish-white undersides.

It is endemic to the Western Ghats of India, where it is known from the Periyar Tiger Reserve in Kerala and Meghamalai Wildlife Sanctuary in Tamil Nadu, although its range is likely larger than currently known. It reproduces by laying eggs, with the only known clutch having eight eggs. The species is currently classified as being data deficient by the IUCN due to a lack of information about it; threats to the species include pesticide usage and chytridiomycosis.

== Taxonomy and systematics ==
Nyctibatrachus manalari was described in 2017 by the herpetologist Sonali Garg and her colleagues based on an adult male specimen collected from the Periyar Tiger Reserve in southeastern Kerala, India in 2016. The specific name manalari refers to Upper Manalar in the Periyar Tiger Reserve, where the specimens used to describe the species were collected.

The species is one of 34 species in the night frog genus Nyctibatrachus, in the robust frog family Nyctibatrachidae. It is sister (most closely related) to N. robinmoorei, and both of these species are further sister to a clade (group formed by all of a common ancestor's descendants) formed by N. anamallaiensis, N. pulivijayani, and N. sabarimalai. The clade formed by these five species is sister to N. beddomii. The following cladogram shows relationships among these species, according to the 2017 study that described the species.

- - N. beddomii
  - - - - N. manalari
        - N. robinmoorei
      - - - - N. anamallaiensis
            - N. sabarimalai
        - N. pulivijayani

== Description ==
N. manalari is a diminutive frog, with a snout–vent length of 13.1–15.4 mm (0.52–0.61 in) for adult males. The head is wider than it is long, and the snout is longer than the diameter of the eye. The tympanum (external ear) is indistinct, and the feet lack webbing.

In adult males, the upperside is reddish-brown, with two orangish-brown stripes running lengthwise from behind the eyelids to mid-back and an orangish-brown between the eyes; the stripes delineate a paler region on the snout. The sides of the head are light greyish-brown, interspersed with white dots, and the flanks are light orangish-brown with small white spots. The undersides and limbs are light reddish-brown; the limbs are marked with dark brown horizontal lines and white spots. The hands and feet are also light reddish-brown but somewhat lighter than the belly.

When preserved in 70% ethanol, the upperside and upper eyelids are dark greyish-brown, while the lines from the eyelids to mid-back are light brown. The sides of the head, flanks, hands, and feet are grey, while the limbs are light grey with dark horizontal bands. The underside is light grayish-white.

N. manalari can be distinguished from its congeners by a combination of its small snout–vent length; the absence of webbed feet; the absence of noticeable wrinkling on the skin of the upperside; weakly developed glandular folds on the upper sides, separated by scattered granular projections; the presence of the dorso-terminal groove on the third finger and fourth toe; a single tubercle on the palm; the thigh and lower leg being shorter than the foot and nearly equal in length to each other; and its reddish-brown uppersides.

Dorsal, ventral, and lateral views of N. manalari
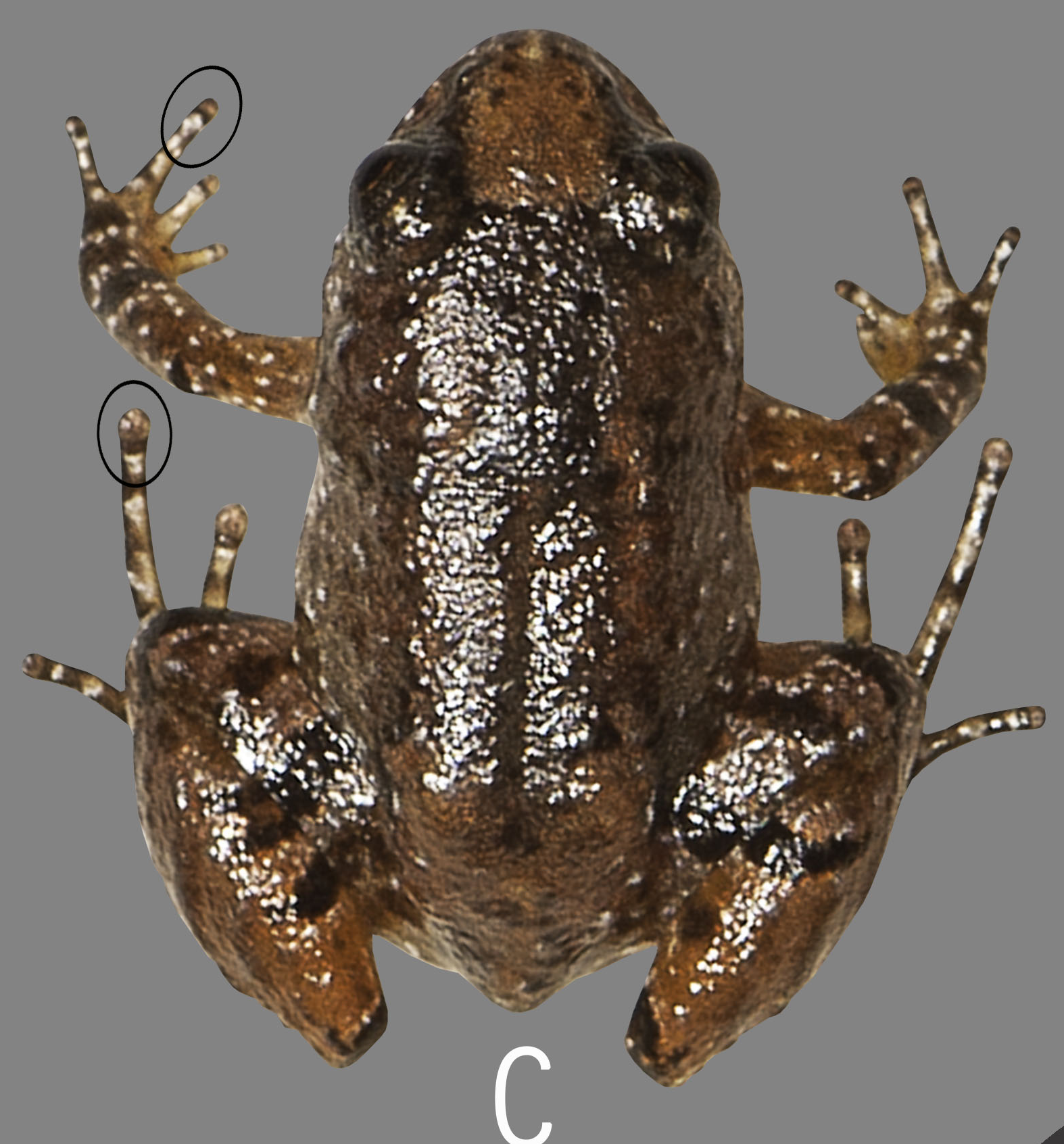
Dorsal view

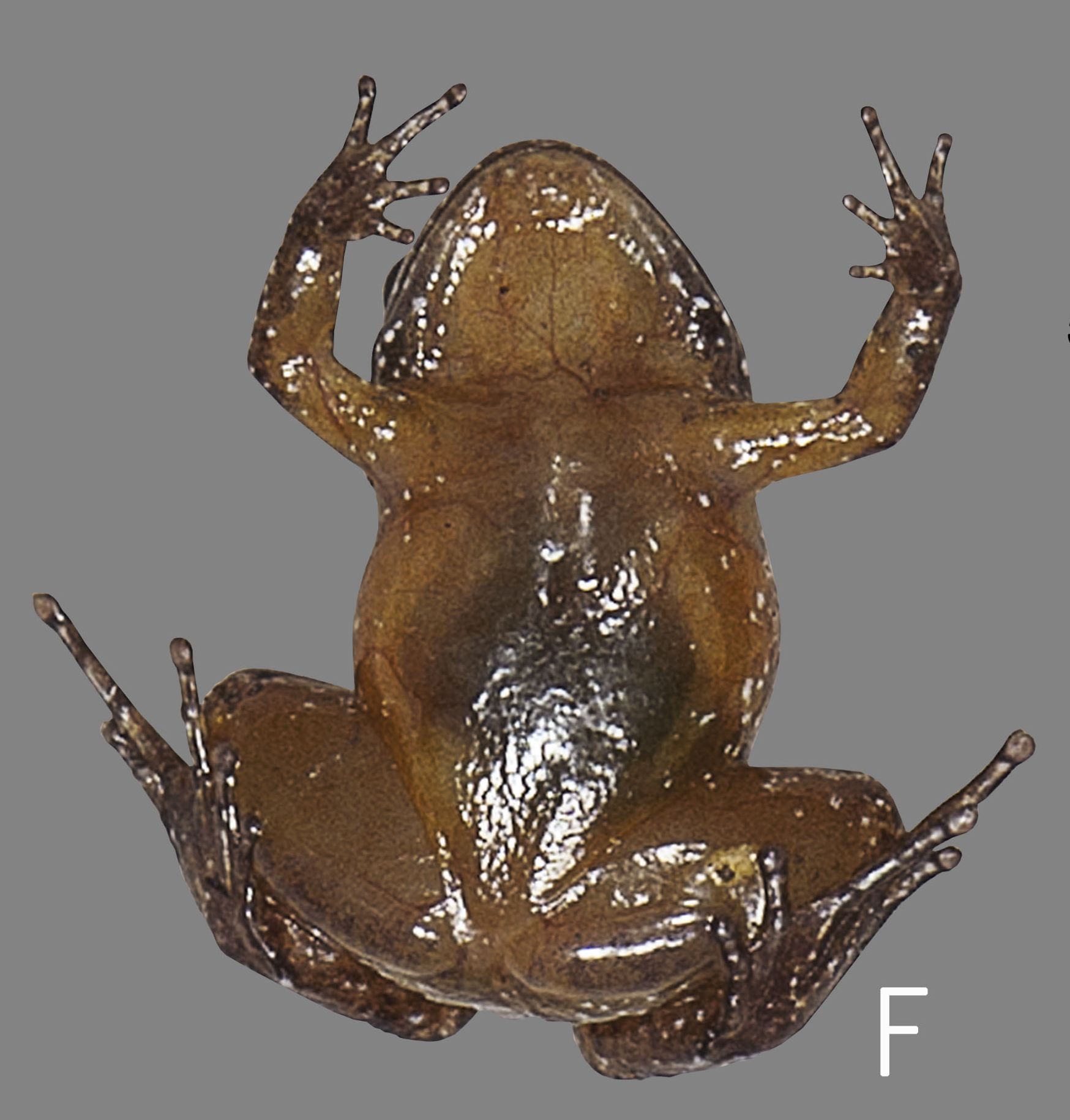
Ventral view

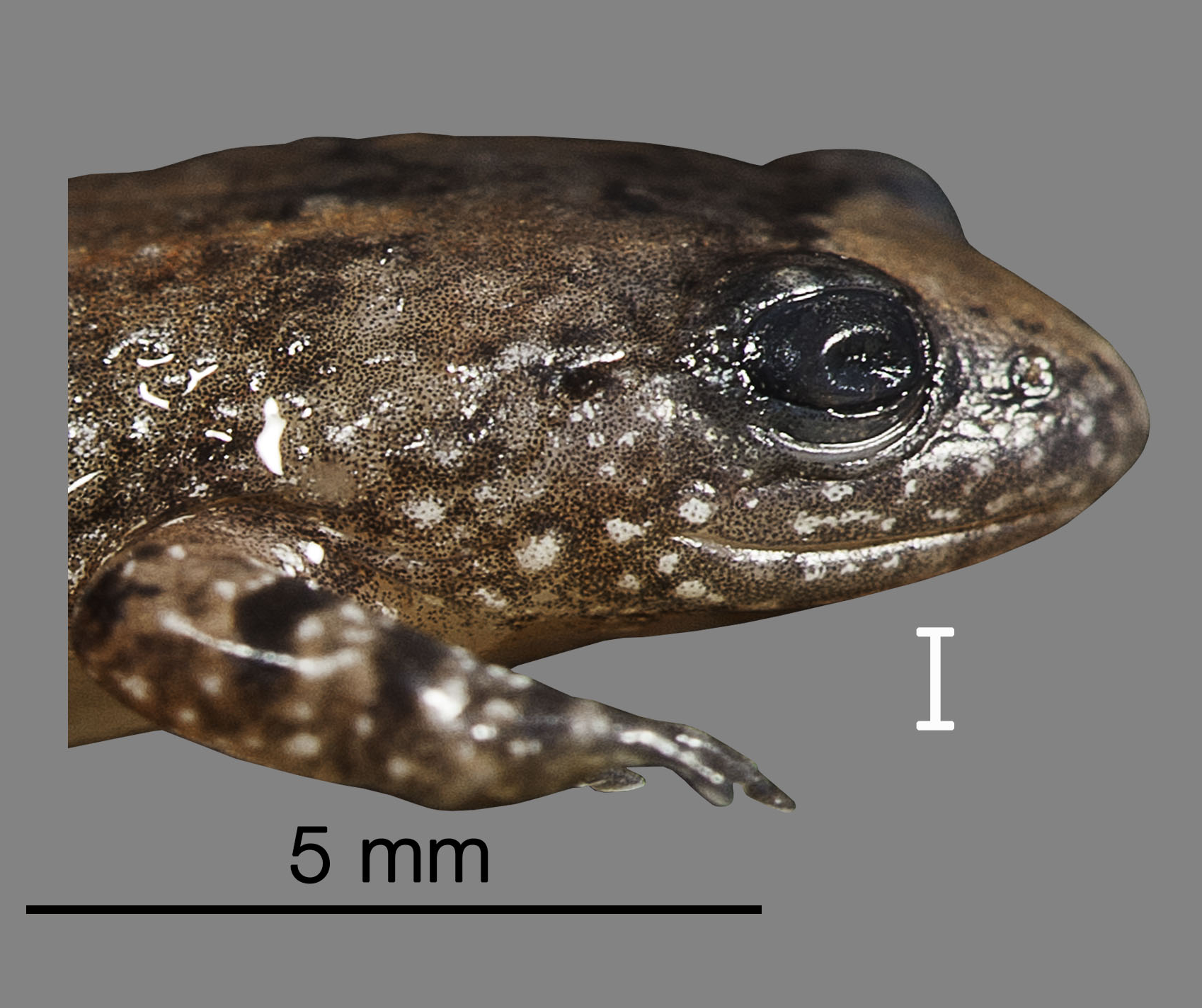
Lateral view

=== Vocalizations ===
The species' calls are single-pulsed and last for 51.1 milliseconds each, with a dominant frequency of 3.6 kHz.

== Habitat and distribution ==
N. manalari is endemic to the Western Ghats of India, where it is known from the Periyar Tiger Reserve in Kerala and Meghamalai Wildlife Sanctuary in Tamil Nadu. Individuals from Kerala were found concealed in undergrowth near a rocky region in a patch of primary evergreen forest at elevations of 1,544–1,584 m (5,066–5,197 ft). In Tamil Nadu, the frogs have been observed inhabiting secondary forest inside a plantation. Its range in the Meghmalai Mountains is probably larger than currently known.

== Ecology and conservation ==
Males of the species have been recorded calling from 7–9 pm and also occasionally during the day, at 2 pm. One of these vocalising males was located next to a clutch of eight eggs laid under vegetation on the ground. Nuptial pads in the species are weakly developed. The species is known to be infected by the amphibian chytrid fungus; however, no deaths from chytridiomycosis have been recorded in the species so far.

N. manalari is currently classified as being data deficient by the IUCN due to the paucity of information regarding its range, population, and ecology. It is thought to be rather common throughout its range, and all known populations of the species reside in protected areas. Potential threats to the species include the usage of pesticides in tea plantations and chytridiomycosis.
