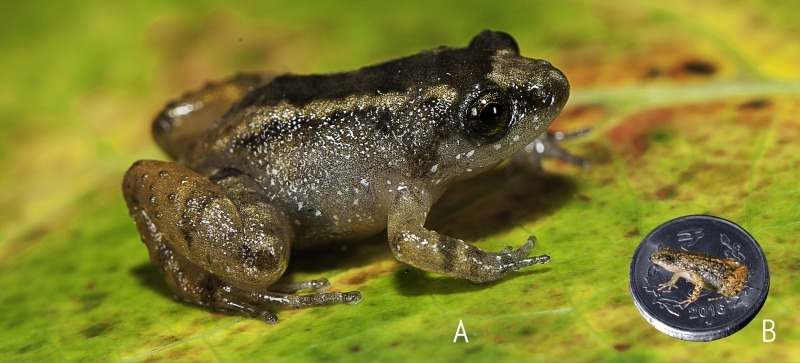
- With Indian five-rupee coin for scale

Scientific classification
- Kingdom: Animalia
- Phylum: Chordata
- Class: Amphibia
- Order: Anura
- Family: Nyctibatrachidae
- Genus: Nyctibatrachus
- Species: N. sabarimalai

Binomial name
- Nyctibatrachus sabarimalai Garg, Suyesh, Sukesan, and Biju, 2017
- Map showing N. sabarimalai's known distribution in the southern Western Ghats

= Nyctibatrachus sabarimalai =

Species of frog

Nyctibatrachus sabarimalai, also known as the Sabarimala night frog or Sabarimala wrinkled frog, is a species of frog in the family Nyctibatrachidae, commonly known as the robust frogs. It was described in 2017, along with six other species in its genus, by the herpetologist Sonali Garg and her colleagues. A small frog, it has an adult male snout–vent length of 12.3–13.2 mm (0.48–0.52 in). It is mainly brown, with a dark brown back, a greyish-white underside, light brown bands running from the eyes to the middle of the back, light brown limbs, and light grey hands and feet. When preserved in ethanol, it is mostly grey, with greyish-white undersides and light grey limbs.

The species is endemic to the Western Ghats of India, where it is known only from the Periyar Tiger Reserve in the state of Kerala, where the specimens used to describe the species were originally collected. It is found in leaf litter in wet areas at elevations of around 210 m (690 ft). The species has not been assigned a conservation status by the IUCN, but may be threatened by high levels of human activity near its habitat caused by pilgrims to the Sabarimala Temple, which is close to the locality where it was discovered.

== Taxonomy ==
Nyctibatrachus sabarimalai was described in 2017 by the herpetologist Sonali Garg and her colleagues based on an adult male specimen collected from the Periyar Tiger Reserve in the state of Kerala. The species is named after the Hindu pilgrimage site of Sabarimala, which is located close to the locality where the type specimens were collected.

The species is one of 34 species in the night frog genus Nyctibatrachus, in the family Nyctibatrachidae, commonly known as the robust frogs. It is sister (most closely related) to N. anamallaiensis, and these two species are together sister to N. pulivijayani. These three species are further sister to a clade (group formed by all of a common ancestor's descendants) formed by N. manalari and N. robinmoorei. The clade formed by these five species is sister to N. beddomii. Some other studies have found N. anamallaiensis to instead be sister to N. pulivijayani, and N. sabarimalai to be sister to the clade formed by these two species. The following cladogram shows relationships among these species, according to the 2017 study that described the species.

- - N. beddomii
  - - - - N. manalari
        - N. robinmoorei
      - - - - N. anamallaiensis
            - N. sabarimalai
        - N. pulivijayani

== Description ==
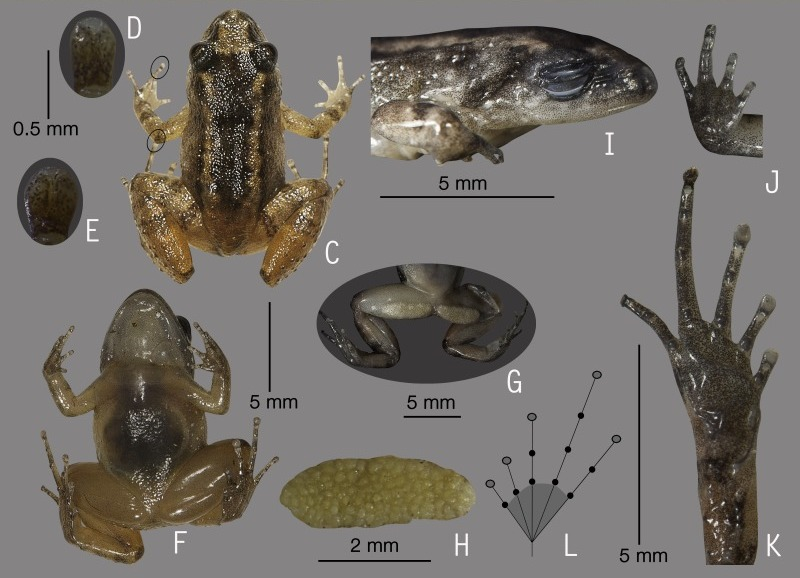
Figure illustrating various aspects of N. sabarimalai in life and when preserved

N. sabarimalai is a diminutive frog, with a snout–vent length of 12.3–13.2 mm (0.48–0.52 in) for adult males. The head is small and longer than it is wide, and the snout is rounded and longer than the diameter of the eye. Males can be distinguished from females by the presence of the nuptial pads and femoral glands (bulbous glands near the inner thigh).

In adult males, the upperside is dark brown, with a pair of light brown bands running from behind the eyelids to the middle of the back. The snout has a triangular light brown patch, demarcated by a light brown stripe between the eyes. The sides of the head are light greyish-brown, with scattered white spots, and the upper eyelids are dark brown. The underside is greyish-white, and the sides of the abdomen are light grey with scattered white spots. The limbs are light brown with dark grey horizontal bands and the hands and feet are slightly lighter grey than the abdomen.

When preserved in 70% ethanol, the upperside is dark grey, while the light patch on the snout, stripe between the eyes, and stripe over the back become light grey. The underside is greyish-white, the limbs are light grey with grey bands, and the sides of the abdomen become greyish-white.

N. sabarimalai can be distinguished from its congeners by a combination of its small snout–vent length; the head being longer than it is wide; the absence of webbed feet; weakly developed glandular folds on the upper sides, separated by scattered granular projections; the presence of the dorso-terminal groove (groove on the upper side of the tip of the digit) on the third finger and fourth toe; the discs on the third finger and fourth toe being slightly sider than the finger and toe, respectively; a single tubercle on the palm; and the thigh, lower leg, and foot being around the same length.

=== Vocalisations ===
Males vocalise by giving pulsed calls; each call is 139.9 milliseconds long and has six pulses, made at a rate of 45.6 per second. Calls are given at a frequency of around 4.4 kiloHertz.

== Distribution, ecology, and conservation ==
N. sabarimalai is endemic to the Western Ghats of India, where it is known only from the Periyar Tiger Reserve, south of the Palakkad Gap in Kerala. All known specimens of the frog have been collected from leaf litter in a shallow forest stream or under the grasses on wet rocky terrain, at an elevation of 210 m (690 ft).

Males are known to vocalise during both the day, from 3 PM to 5 PM, and at night, from 8 PM to 10 PM. One male was seen vocalizing close to the clutch it was guarding. Eggs are large and pigmented, with an average diameter of 2.4 mm (0.094 in), and are deposited in slits inside tree stumps. The only observed clutch was around 0.3 m (1.0 ft) above the ground and had ten eggs. The species has not yet been assessed by the IUCN, although it may be threatened from the high levels of human activity near its habitat caused by pilgrims to the Sabarimala Temple.
