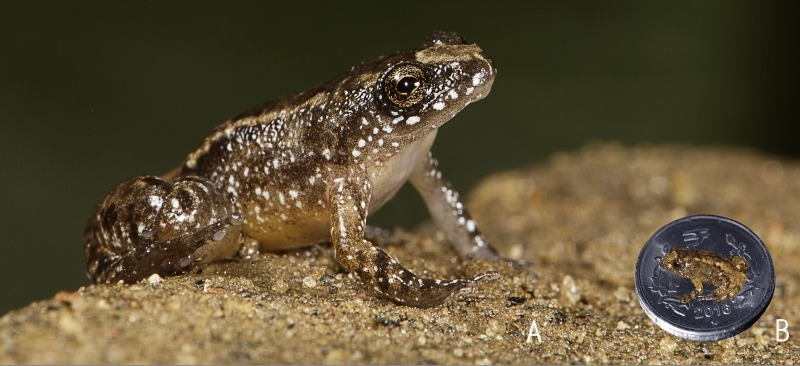
- With Indian five-rupee coin for scale

Scientific classification
- Kingdom: Animalia
- Phylum: Chordata
- Class: Amphibia
- Order: Anura
- Family: Nyctibatrachidae
- Genus: Nyctibatrachus
- Species: N. robinmoorei

Binomial name
- Nyctibatrachus robinmoorei Garg, Suyesh, Sukesan, and Biju, 2017
- Map showing N. robinmoorei's known distribution in the southern Western Ghats

= Nyctibatrachus robinmoorei =

Species of frog

Nyctibatrachus robinmoorei, also known as Robin Moore's night frog or the Tirunelveli wrinkled frog, is a species of frog in the family Nyctibatrachidae, commonly known as the robust frogs. It was described in 2017, along with six other species in its genus, by the herpetologist Sonali Garg and her colleagues. A small frog, it has an adult male snout–vent length of 12.2–13.4 mm (0.48–0.53 in). It is mainly reddish-brown, with a light grey underside, light orangish-brown bands running from the eyes to the middle of the back, light brown limbs, and darker brown hands and feet. When preserved in ethanol, it is mostly brown, with light greyish-white undersides and light greyish-brown limbs.

The species is endemic to the Western Ghats of India, where it is known only from the Kalakkad Mundanthurai Tiger Reserve in the state of Tamil Nadu, where the specimens used to describe the species were originally collected. It is found in marshy areas near streams at elevations of around 1,290 m (4,230 ft). The species has not been assigned a conservation status by the IUCN.

== Taxonomy ==
Nyctibatrachus robinmoorei was described in 2017 by the herpetologist Sonali Garg and her colleagues based on an adult male specimen collected from the Kalakkad Mundanthurai Tiger Reserve in the state of Tamil Nadu. The species is named after the conservationist and wildlife photographer Robin Moore to honour his contributions to the conservation of amphibians.

The species is one of 34 species in the genus Nyctibatrachus, commonly known as the night frogs, in the family Nyctibatrachidae, commonly known as the robust frogs. It is sister (most closely related) to N. manalari, and both of these species are further sister to a clade (group formed by all of a common ancestor's descendants) formed by N. anamallaiensis, N. pulivijayani, and N. sabarimalai. The clade formed by these five species is sister to N. beddomii. The following cladogram shows relationships among these species, according to the 2017 study that described the species.

- - N. beddomii
  - - - - N. manalari
        - N. robinmoorei
      - - - - N. anamallaiensis
            - N. sabarimalai
        - N. pulivijayani

== Description ==
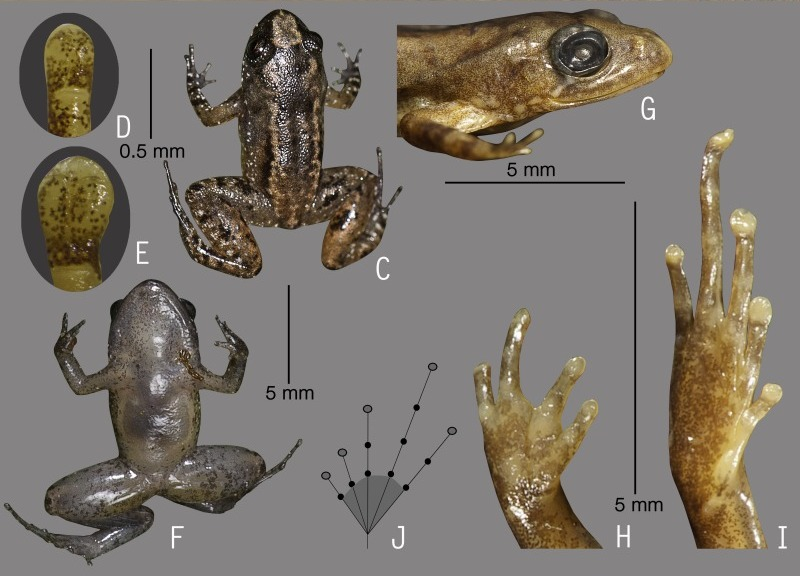
Figure illustrating various aspects of N. robinmoorei's appearance in life and after preservation

N. robinmoorei is a diminutive frog, with a snout–vent length of 12.2–13.4 mm (0.48–0.53 in) for adult males. The head is almost as wide as it is long, and the snout is rounded and longer than the diameter of the eye. Males can be distinguished from females by the presence of the nuptial pads and femoral glands (bulbous glands near the inner thigh).

In adult males, the upperside is reddish-brown, with a pair of light orangish-brown bands running from behind the eyelids to the middle of the back. The snout has a triangular light orangish-brown patch, demarcated by a light orangish-brown stripe between the eyes. The sides of the head are dark greyish-brown, with scattered minute black speckles and prominent white spots, and the upper eyelids are dark greyish-brown. The underside is light grey with prominent minute black spots, and the sides of the abdomen are light brown with scattered white spots. The limbs are light brown with faint dark grey horizontal bands, with the hands and feet being slightly darker.

When preserved in 70% ethanol, the upperside turns brown, while the light patch on the snout, the stripe between the eyes, and the stripe over the back becomes light brown. The underside turns light greyish-white with dark grey spots, the limbs turn light greyish-brown, and the sides of the abdomen become light greyish-brown.

N. robinmoorei can be distinguished from other species in its genus by a combination of its small snout–vent length; the head being almost as wide as it is long; the absence of webbed feet; weakly developed glandular folds on the upper sides, separated by scattered granular projections; the presence of the dorso-terminal groove (groove on the upper side of the tip of the digit) on the third finger and fourth toe; the discs on third finger and fourth toe being slightly wider than the finger and toe, respectively; a single tubercle on the palm; the thigh being longer than both the lower leg and foot; and the forearm being longer than the hand.

== Distribution, ecology, and conservation ==
N. robinmoorei is endemic to the Western Ghats of India, where it is known only from its type locality in Tirunelveli district, south of the Palakkad Gap in Tamil Nadu. All known specimens of the frog have been collected from a marshy area with thick ground vegetation near a stream inside primary forest at an elevation of 1,290 m (4,230 ft). Male are known to vocalise during the afternoon, from 12 PM to 2 PM, and late in the evening, around 6 PM. A female collected in late August had 15 small, pigmented eggs, with an average egg diameter of 1.7 mm (0.067 in). The species has not yet been assessed by the IUCN.
