= Meghamalai =

Mountain range in Kerala, India

Meghamalai (Tamil: மேகமலை), commonly known as the High Wavy Mountains, is a mountain range located in the Western Ghats in the Theni district near Kumily, Tamil Nadu. It is dotted with cardamom plantations and tea plantations. The mountain range is 1,500 metres above sea level, and it is rich in flora and fauna. The area, now mostly planted with tea plants, includes cloudlands, high wavys, venniar, and the manalar estates belonging to the Woodbriar Group. Access is largely restricted and includes largely untouched remnants of evergreen forest.

== Megamalai Wildlife Sanctuary ==
For a long time, there has been a pending proposal with the Tamil Nadu Forest Department to establish the Megamalai Wildlife Sanctuary on 600 km^{2} of forest in the division. The suggested priority tasks in the sanctuary include: the control of poaching, the use of pesticides for the elimination of ganja (Cannabis sativa) and the cultivation as well as scientific management of watersheds. The Megamalai Wildlife Sanctuary can be an excellent buffer to the Periyar Tiger Reserve and Grizzled Squirrel Wildlife Sanctuary which can immensely strengthen the conservation in the southern Western Ghats – the range of hills south of the Palakkad Gap.

Wildlife found on the High Wavy Mountains include Oriental honey buzzard, great pied hornbill, Indian brown mongoose, Jerdon's palm civet, white-bellied short-wing, black-naped monarch, pied thrush, gaur, tiger, leopard, Asian elephant, mouse deer, Ghatixalus asterops, Raorchestes beddomii, Raorchestes ponmudi, Nyctibatrachus sp., Ramanella triangularis, Ramanella montana, Calotes grandisquamis, Hemidactylus anamallensis, Salea anamallayana, Kaestlea travancorica, Kaestlea laterimaculata, Uropeltis madurensis, Uropeltis liura, Calliophis nigrescens, large-scaled pit viper and the enigmatic Hutton's pit viper.

When the high wavys group of estates were managed by Hindustan Unilever, the company started a non-profit organization called the Megamalai Wildlife and Environment Association. It worked with the forest department to protect the endangered species and safeguard the forest and its creatures; it did so by putting up signs promoting the preservation of nature and animals along the Ghat road of Meghamalai. Unfortunately, most of these signs were destroyed in an expansion project that took place on the Ghat road. The forest department has put new signs to replace the damaged ones.

=== Megamalai Tiger Reserve ===
On 6 April 2021, the Government of India approved the creation of new Tiger Reserve in tamil nadu and on 11 April 2021, Meghamalai Tiger Reserve was created. Meghamalai Tiger Reserve will now comprise both the Srivilliputhur Grizzled Squirrel Wildlife Sanctuary & Tirunelveli Wildlife Sanctuary. With its new status as a Tiger reserve, Meghamalai Tiger Reserve has become the 5th Tiger Reserve of Tamil Nadu and 51st Tiger Reserve in India. Meghamalai Tiger Reserve also acts as a contiguous patch of forest (earlier buffer zone) for the Periyar Wildlife Sanctuary, via the Grizzled Squirrel Wildlife Sanctuary. In addition, it is believed that Meghamalai Tiger Reserve will become the crucial corridor/contiguous forest stretch and aid in the movement of wildlife from Periyar Tiger Reserve, to Meghamalai Forests. Wildlife conservationists also hope that with the formation of the Meghamalai Tiger Reserve, greater protection will also be accorded the Vaigai river which originates in Meghamalai. The Tiger reserve will also be known as the Meghamalai-Srivilliputhur Tiger Reserve.

== Flora ==
According to the experts the last extensive study of flora in the biodiversity-rich, Meghamalai have been conducted in the early 1980s. Since then, no comprehensive research has been done on the vegetation. Vegetation ranges from scrub forests at the foothills, ubiquitous expanses of tea and coffee estates, to spice (pepper, cardamom, cinnamon) plantations and finally to the dense evergreen forests at the top.

== Fauna ==
Meghamalai forest area hosts a variety of birds, mammals, reptiles and butterflies. Resident and migratory elephants are also common. There are hundreds of identified species:

=== Wildlife of Meghamalai Tiger Reserve ===
- Spotted deer
- Spotted dove
- Barking deer
- Sambar deer
- Mouse deer
- Grizzled giant squirrel
- Indian flying fox
- Indian giant squirrel
- Indian giant flying squirrel
- Pied thrush
- Black bulbul
- Meghamalai rock gecko
- Black baza
- White-bellied woodpecker
- White-bellied drongo
- Drongo cuckoo
- Black-naped oriole
- Black-naped monarch
- Black-naped hare
- Bengal tiger
- Dhole
- Great pied hornbill
- Malabar pied hornbill
- Oriental honey-buzzard
- Dusky palm squirrel
- Gaur

== Tourist attractions ==
Magamalai-180 panoramic view

=== Tea estates and dams ===
The Highwavys provide a view of the entire mountain range of Varusanadu Hills. There are large private tea, spices, and coffee plantations all around, notably the Highwavys Group of Estates. Ananda Plantations, Ponsiva Plantations, and Fieldmede Estate, are also some of the other small plantations in Meghamalai. An artificial lake makes plenty of scope for leisurely walks. Kardana Coffee Estate is situated in the High Wavy Mountains at 9°42′N 77°24′E.

Six dams on the hill and originating place of Suruli Theertham (Suruli falls near Cumbum town) are popular attractions for tourists. From the Manalar dam, one can view the deep Cumbum Valley and the villages of Theni district. The Department of Tourism has planned to introduce a boat or ferry service to enable tourists to access the area.

=== Vellimalai ===
The Vellimalai (Silver Mountain, 1,650 m) area is the heart of Meghamalai. Silver-lined clouds seem to rest gently on green hilltops; nestled in this region is the place where the river Vaigai originates. This place offers an opportunity to see wild animals aesthetically and scientifically managed tea gardens.

== Falls ==
Meghamalai Falls (Suruli Falls) is on the Suruli River originating in the Meghamalai Hills. Water flows down 58 meters through the twin falls. There are frequent visits by elephants, spotted deer, gaur, and other wild animals at dawn and dusk. Forest Department officials have plans to assist tourists in viewing these wild animals.

== Encroachment threat ==
Massive encroachments in the reserved forests of almost all divisions in the district have been posing a threat to the eco-system of the Megamalai hills. Of the total 806.86 km^{2}, about 400.77 km^{2} were degraded forest area. A total of 292.81 km^{2} falls under dense forest areas, of which only 22.43 km^{2} was tree bearing. About 220 out of 430 km^{2} of the Gandamanur forest range under the Madurai Forest Division had encroached in the past four decades. Large areas of Ulloothu Kavu, Anjaraipuli, Elamalaipoodu, Arasaradi, Bommarasapuram, and neighboring villages were also encroached. With an increase in population and their demands, vast stretches of land were either degraded or converted into uni-crop areas, causing damage to the environment. The people settled in the hill tracts were solely dependent on the forests for livelihood. Conservation of natural forest in any form will help preserve biodiversity.

== Access ==
The Meghamalai mountain range can be approached two ways—from Theni via Chinnamanur, or Andipatti via Kandamanayakkanur. Both can be accessed by road from Madurai and Dindigul. Theni is 76 km from Madurai. The road from the turnoff near Chinnamanur before Iravangalar was under the responsibility of the Woodbriar group; due to lack of maintenance, the government has started to maintain it. Only forest lodges and panchayath rest houses are available at the hilltop. Day-trippers may stay in hotels in Theni, Chinnamanur and Andipatti. The distance from Madurai is 130 km.

The website for Mehamalai has a warning against travelling there in June and July.

== Gallery ==
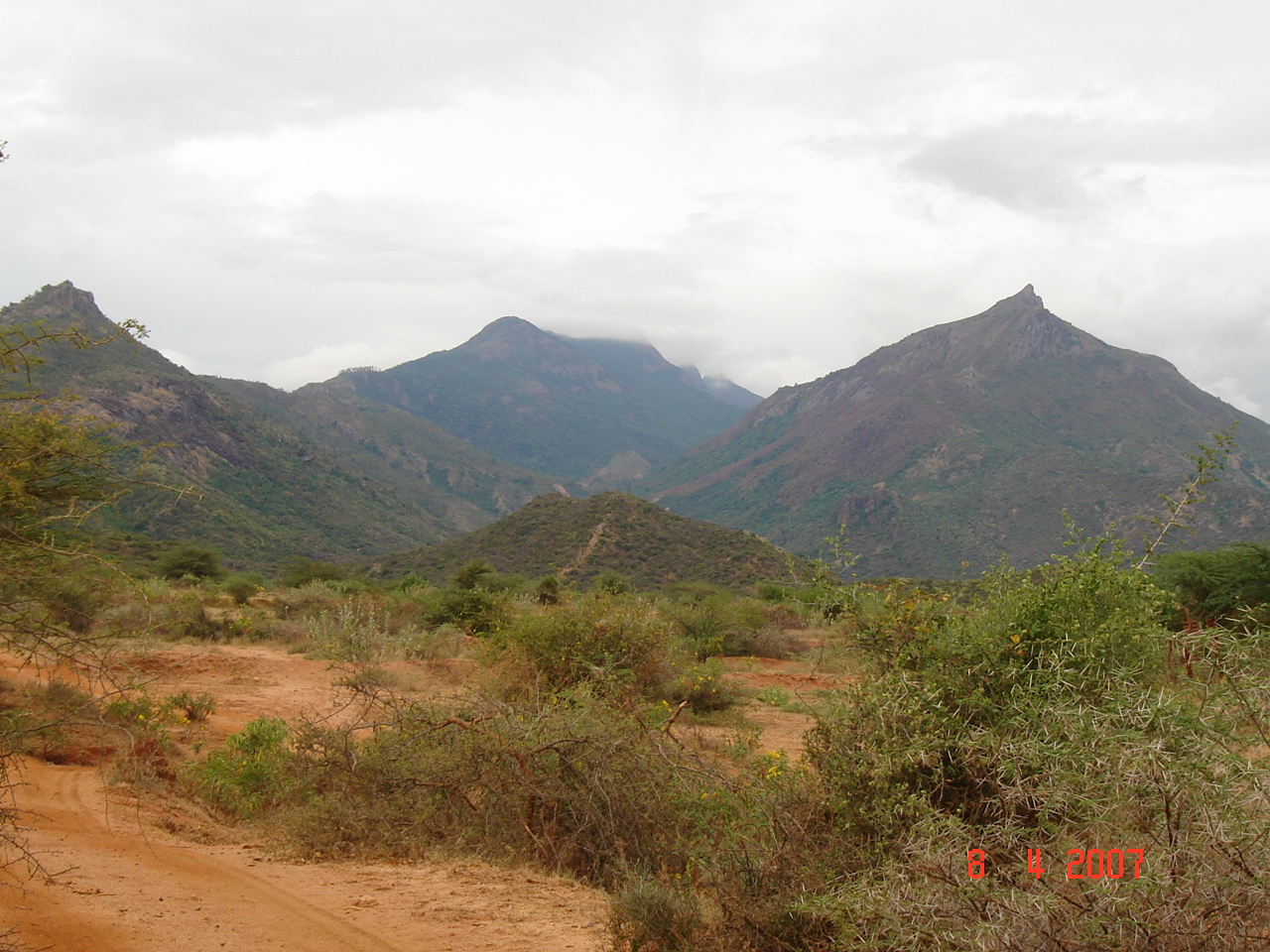
Meghamalai Mountains

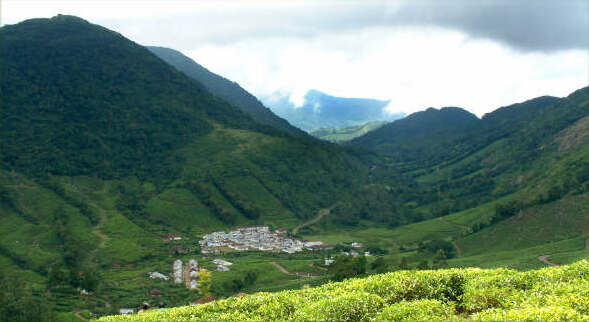
Meghamalai

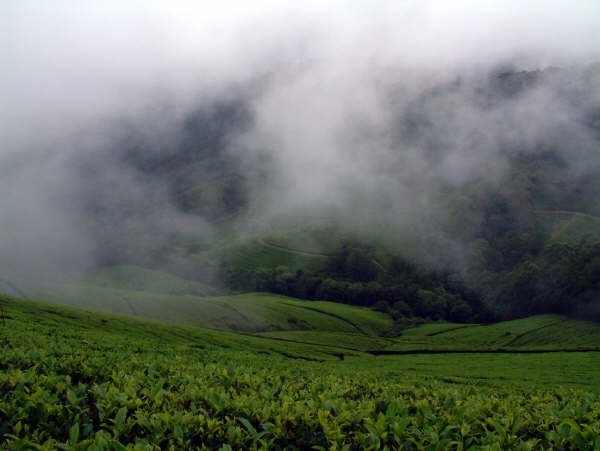
Cloudy Mountain

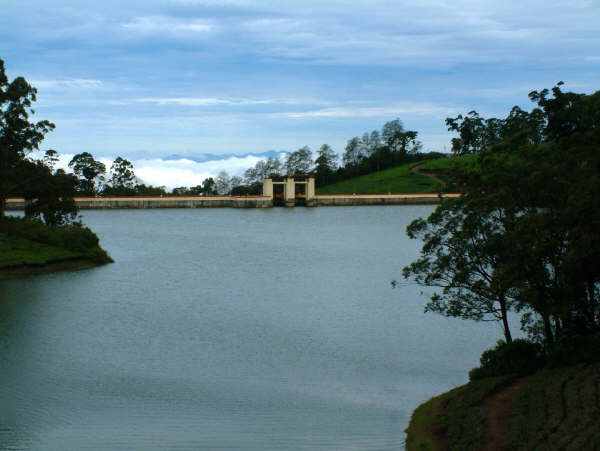
Manalaru Dam

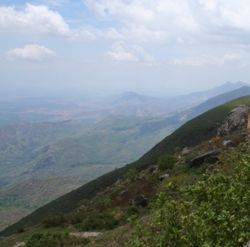
View of Cumbam Valley

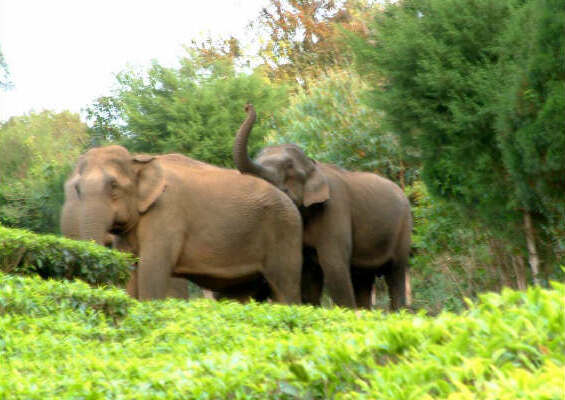
Wildlife

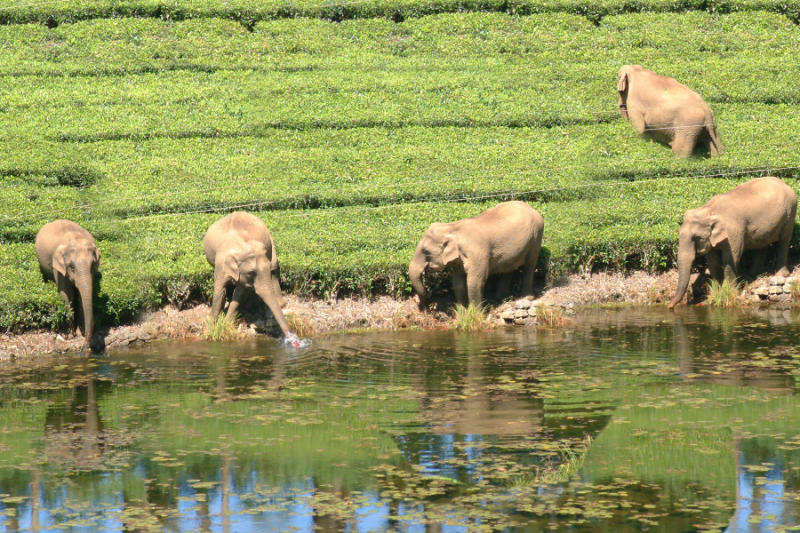
Asian elephant in megamalai tea estate

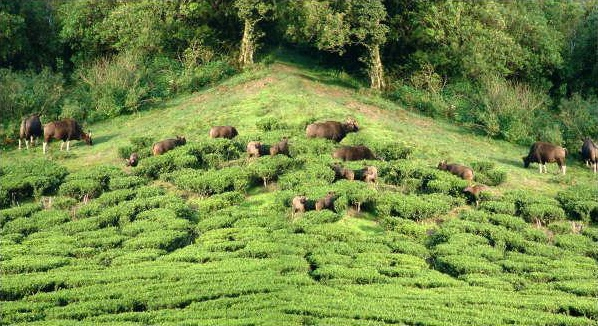
Bisons at Meghamalai

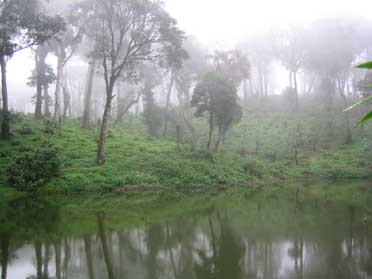
Forest

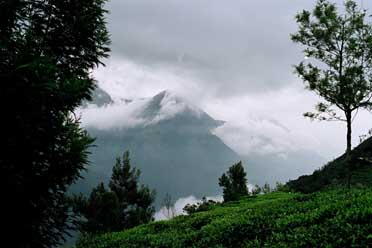
Meghamalai

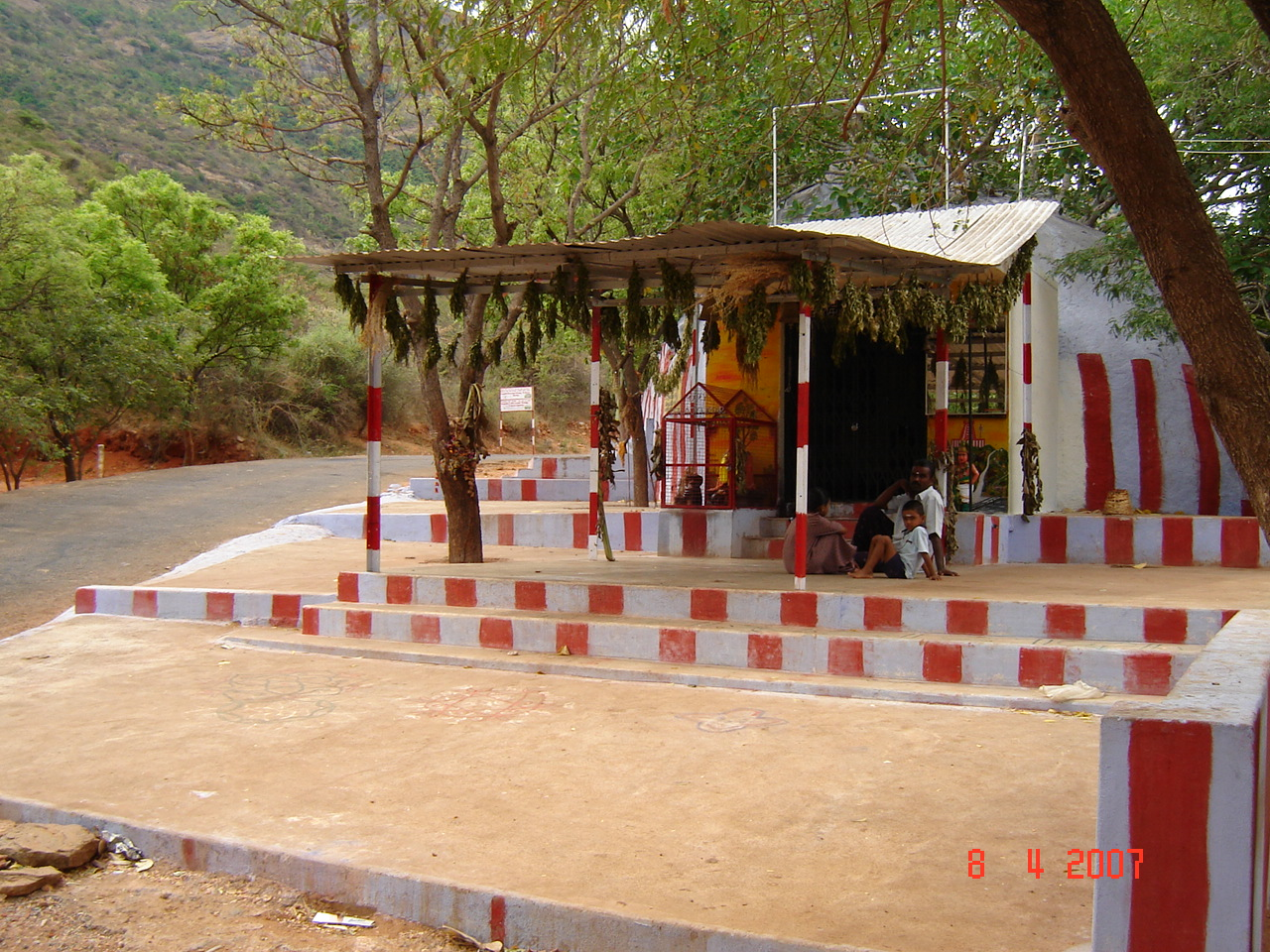
Murugan Temple on the foot hill

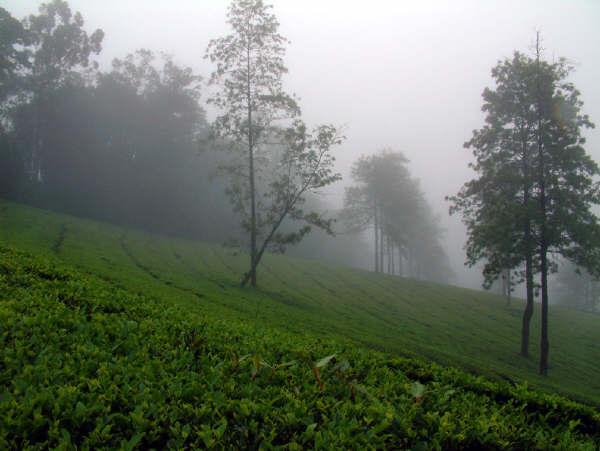
Upper Manalar Estate

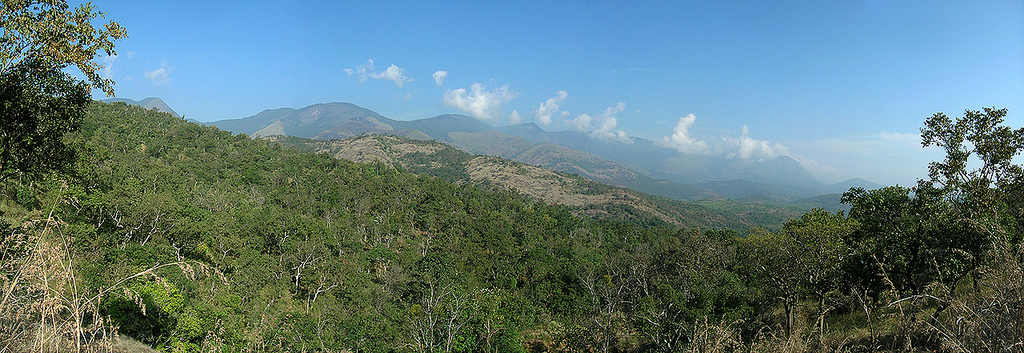
The Highwavys of Theni district

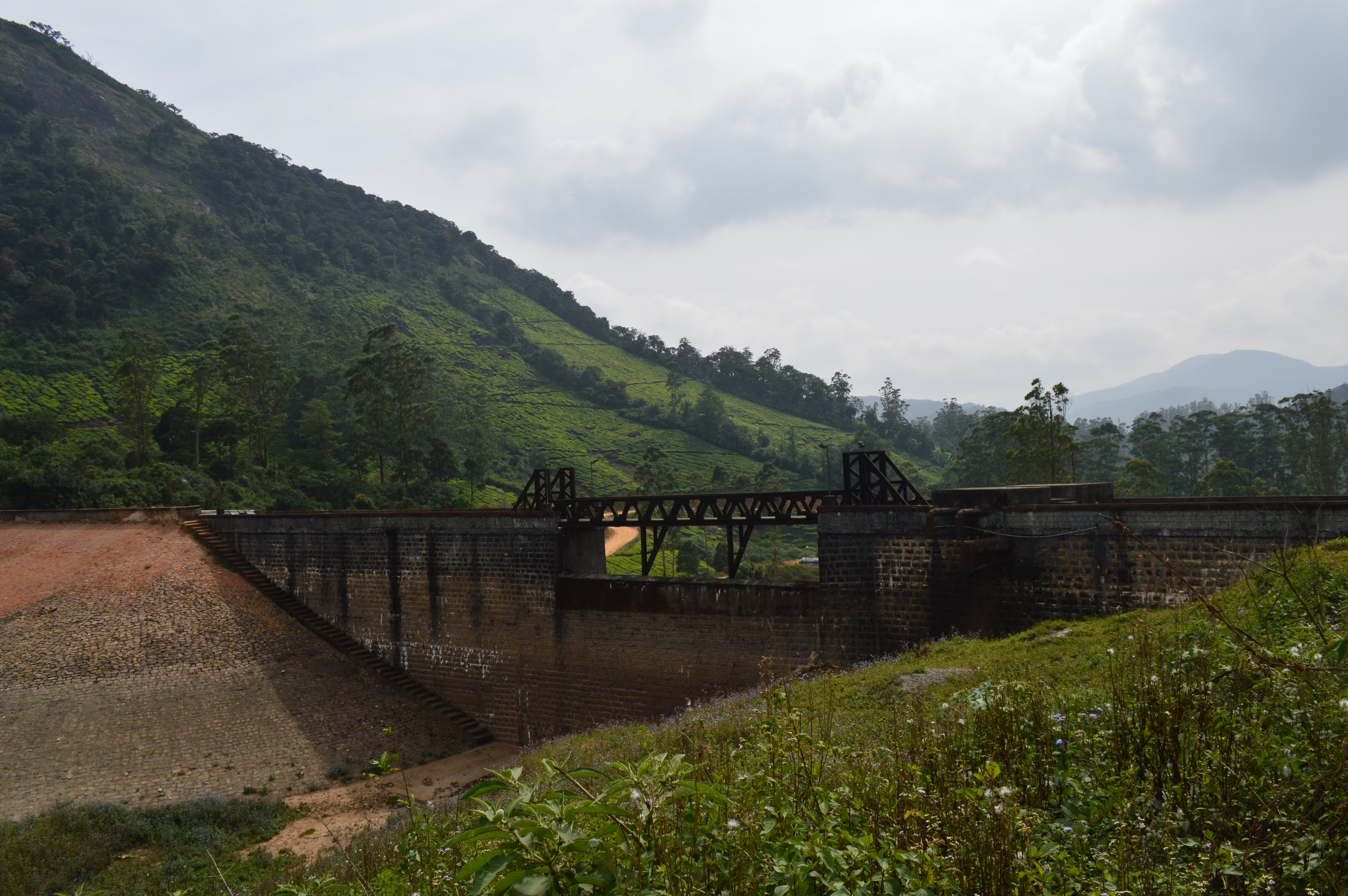
High Wavys Dam

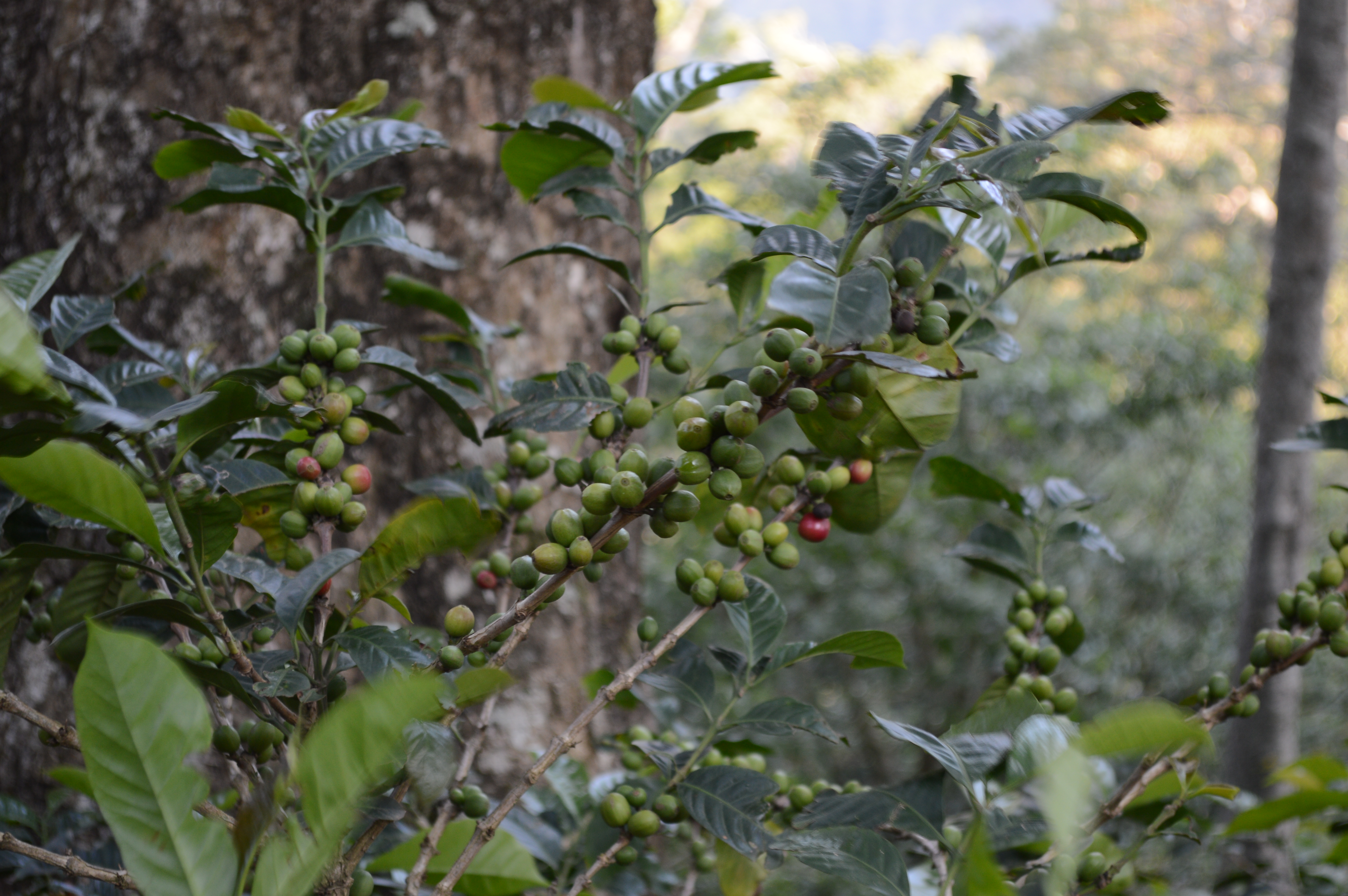
Meghamalai Coffee Plant
