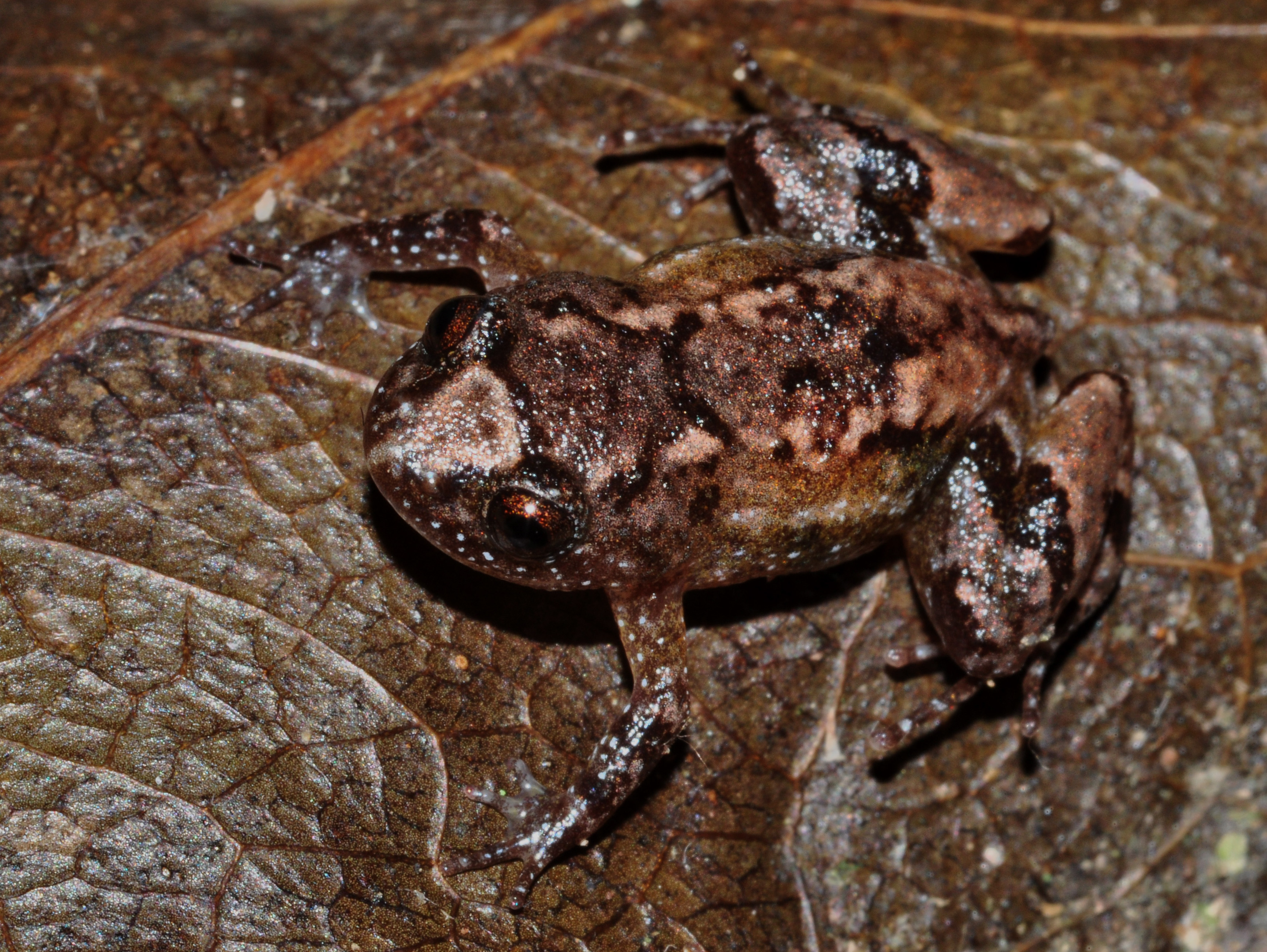
- Dorsal view

Conservation status
- Endangered (IUCN 3.1)

Scientific classification
- Kingdom: Animalia
- Phylum: Chordata
- Class: Amphibia
- Order: Anura
- Family: Nyctibatrachidae
- Genus: Nyctibatrachus
- Species: N. beddomii

Binomial name
- Nyctibatrachus beddomii (Boulenger, 1882)

Synonyms
- Nannobatrachus beddomii Boulenger, 1882

= Nyctibatrachus beddomii =

Species of amphibian

Nyctibatrachus beddomii (common names: Beddome's night frog, pigmy wrinkled frog, Beddome's dwarf wrinkled frog, and Tirunelveli's hill frog) is a species of frog in the family Nyctibatrachidae.

== Taxonomy ==
The epithet or specific name, beddomii, honors Colonel Richard Henry Beddome (1830–1911), British naturalist and military officer.

The species is one of 34 species in the night frog genus Nyctibatrachus, in the robust frog family Nyctibatrachidae. Within its genus, it is part of a clade (group formed by all of a common ancestor's descendants) that includes N. manalari, N. robinmoorei, N. anamallaiensis, N. sabarimalai, and N. pulivijayani. It is basal within the group and is sister (most closely related) to a clade that includes the other five species. The following cladogram shows relationships among these species, according to a 2017 study.

- - N. beddomii
  - - - - N. manalari
        - N. robinmoorei
      - - - - N. anamallaiensis
            - N. sabarimalai
        - N. pulivijayani

== Size ==
Adult can length up from 13–18 mm (0.51–0.71 in).

== Distribution and habitat ==
It is endemic to southern Western Ghats of India.

Nyctibatrachus beddomii are semi-terrestrial frogs found in the leaf-litter but also under rocks and logs in evergreen and semi-evergreen moist and deciduous forests. The small sized frog is commonly seen in swampy areas and shallow waterlogged areas along forest streams. Call is a faint 'tink-tink' repeated several times, largely at night.

== Conservation status ==
It is threatened by habitat loss caused by logging and clearing for agriculture. It listed as an Endangered species by the IUCN.
