= Geography of Madurai =

Madurai is a city in the Indian state of Tamil Nadu and administrative headquarters of Madurai District. It is the third largest municipal corporation in Tamil Nadu.

== Topology ==
The average elevation of the city is

== Divisions ==
For the administration purpose the city is divided into four zones by the municipal corporation administration. Madurai East zone, Madurai West zone, Madurai North zone, Madurai South zone.

== Civic amenities ==
Drinking water for the city is mostly dependent on Vaigai River.

== Landmarks ==
Madurai has many popular temples including the Hindu Meenakshi Amman (Minakshi-Sundareshwara) Temple. The Vistadome Coach on the Madurai-Guruvayur Express started in October 2026 provides some good view of many of the sceinic spots.
