= Varusanadu =

Village in Tamil Nadu, India

Varusanadu is a valley village panchayat (code: 232202) in Theni District of Tamil Nadu, which is located on the bank of Vaigai River. This village comes under Kadamalaigundu - Mayiladumparai Panchayat union and Andipatti Taluk.

The valley around this area is called Varusanadu Valley, which is a part of Cumbum Valley in Western Ghats and is connected to Meghamalai Mountains. Vaigai River is originating from this valley under Periyar Plateau of Western Ghats.

== History ==
During earlier periods (way before Indian Independence), this area is completely occupied by trees in the Valley area. A well known Tamil proverb "Varusanattukku pona, vacha edatha sollittu po" (Before leaving to varusanadu, let someone know about your properties and belongings) to give an indication that 'no one ever come back alive after visiting this valley, it is such a danger'. This area was under Kandamanur Zamindar before independence.

== Agriculture ==
Ilavam Panju, Mundhiri Kottai, Sugarcane, Coconut, Rice , Ground nut are majorly produced in this area. 'Varusanadu Coconut' is a known variety of coconut in coconut markets of Tamil Nadu, and is originated from this area.

== Politics ==
This place comes under Aundipatty State Assembly Constituency. Since known politicians in Tamil Nadu like M.G.Ramachandran, J.Jayalalithaa and S.S.Rajendran were elected from this constituency, this area is popular in Politics in Madurai District. From Indian Nation Politics level, this area comes under Theni Lokshaba Constituency.

== Other information ==
- SH-101 (State Highways of Tamil Nadu) - is between Varusanadu and Vaigai Dam
- Churches in this area comes under Velankanni Mission Church, Kadamalaikundu of Archdiocese of Madurai.
- Panchanthaangi hills (Hill that survives in drought), Velli Malai (Silver Hills) are the other known hills in this area/valley.
