= Kadamalaigundu =

Village in Theni District, Tamil Nadu, India

Coordinates: 9.811°N 77.503°E

Kadamalaikundu is a village in Theni district, Tamil Nadu state, India. It is near Kandamanur and has very nice places and a natural mount near Vaigai River about 8 kilometres (5.0 mi) from the Suruli Falls.
