= Kadamalaigundu–Mayiladumparai Panchayat Union =

Kadamalaigundu - Mayiladumparai is a Panchayat union of Theni Revenue district in the state of Tamil Nadu.

== Education ==
- G R Varatharajulu Higher Secondary School

== Villages ==
Following is the list of Village Panchayats that come under this union

- Athankaraipatti
- Duraichamipuram
- Ettapparajapuram
- Gandamanur
- Kadamalaikundu
- Kumananthozhu
- Manthisunai moolakadai
- Megamalai
- Murukkodai
- Muthalamparai
- Myladumparai (also known as Mayiladumparai)
- Nariyuthu
- Paaluthu
- Ponnanpadugai
- Singarajapuram
- Thangammalpuram
- Thummakundu
- Varusanadu
