= Suruli Falls =

Waterfall in Tamil Nadu, India

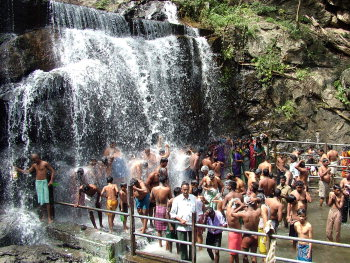
- Suruli Falls
- Interactive map of Suruli Falls
- Location: Theni District, Tamil Nadu
- Coordinates: 9°39′52″N 77°18′12″E
- Type: Cascade
- Elevation: 410 m (1,350 ft)
- Total height: 190 ft (58 m)
- Number of drops: 2
- Longest drop: 150 ft (46 m)
- Watercourse: Suruli River

Suruli falls, is located 56 km (35 mi) from Theni and 10 km (6.2 mi) from Cumbum in the Theni District in Tamil Nadu, India. It is a 2 stage Cascading water fall. The Suruli River supplying the falls originates from the Meghamalai mountain range. The falls drop from a height of 150 feet (46 m) gathers into a pool, flows for a short distance and again plummets an additional 40 feet (12 m).

== History ==
The beauty of this falls finds mention in the ancient Tamil literature, Silappathikaram written by the poet Ilango Adigal. Near Suruli Falls are five caves which represent 11th century Indian rock-cut architecture. The Suruli river's water is considered medicinal and curative.

== Tourism ==
It is one of the major tourist attractions in the Theni district and draws tourists from different parts of the state, particularly during the southwest monsoon. June - October is the best season due to monsoon activity, though there is some flow year round. This falls is tourist friendly with showers and changing area near the falls. There are frequent bus services available from Cumbum and Uthamapalayam to reach this falls on the way to Periyar National Park. The Tamil Nadu Tourism Department celebrates summer festival at Suruli falls every year. Construction of a bridge across the Suruli River at a cost of Rs.45 lakhs has increased tourist flow to the falls significantly.

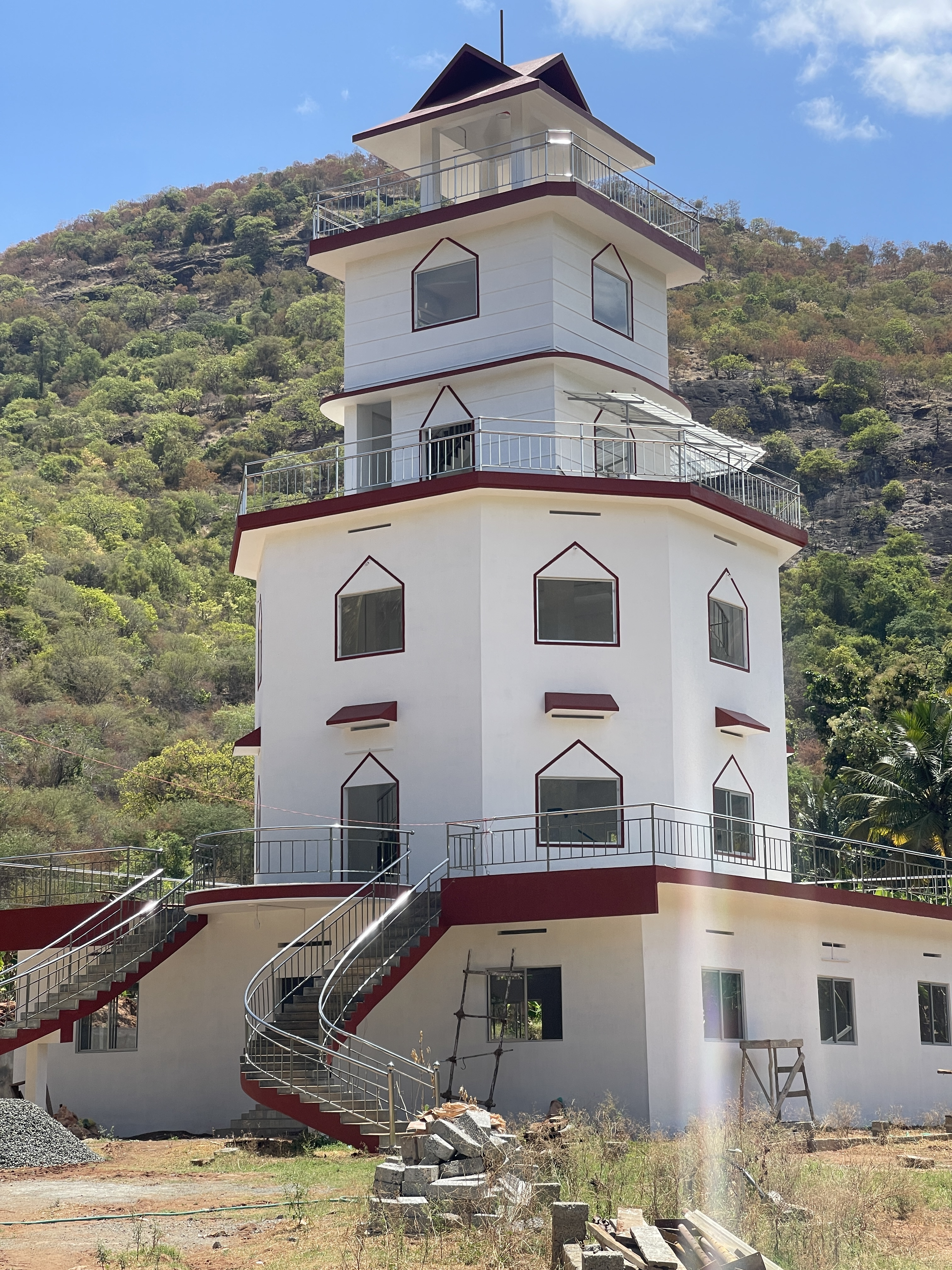
Shakthimigu Annai Sri Jeyameena Thirukovil

The beautiful, 90-foot-tall Shakthimigu Annai Sri Jeyameena Thirukovil temple honours the mother goddess Sri Jeyameena Jeyameena. It is the first of its kind in the world to be built for a mother by her son (Dr. Jeganth) and husband (Er. Jeyaraj) to honour her dedication, purity and sacrifice as a mother and to showcast the world the courage she displayed while she fought cancer. She stood tall during her critical illness and was brave enough to console her loved ones that "She will be always with us... Whenever we call, she will stand for us and bless us with whatever we wish". The divine words told by her and the faith others had on her turned out to be true.

This temple will stand as a symbol of true love and how a mother should be respected by her children, "A mother is more than a god". This temple will also serve as a support centre for cancer affected people in future.

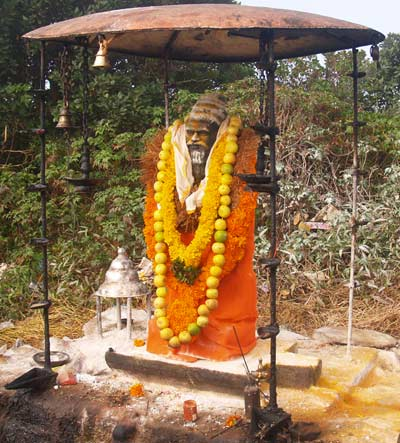
Idol of Agasthya Muni at the top of Agasthyamalai peak

Suruli hills is the part of the Pothigai Malai. Pothigai hills is a highly divine and spiritual center. There is a story that when Shiva and Parvati entered into divine matrimony at Mount Kailash in the north, the place was unbalanced because of the multitude of holy beings witnessing the wedding. Lord Shiva asked Agastya Maharishi to proceed to southern India to balance the world. Agastya Maharishi then proceeded to Pothigai hills and balanced the world. Agastya Maharishi was able to visualise the wedding of Lord Shiva and Parvati on a Shivalingam that was at Tiru Kalyana Teertham at Pothigai hills. These hills are visited by several saints and sages from Himalayas particularly on a full moon day. The striking similarity between the profiles of Mount Kailash and Agasthyamalai strengthen the mythological connections of these sacred peaks.

Similarity of Agasthyamalai Peak and Mount Kailash

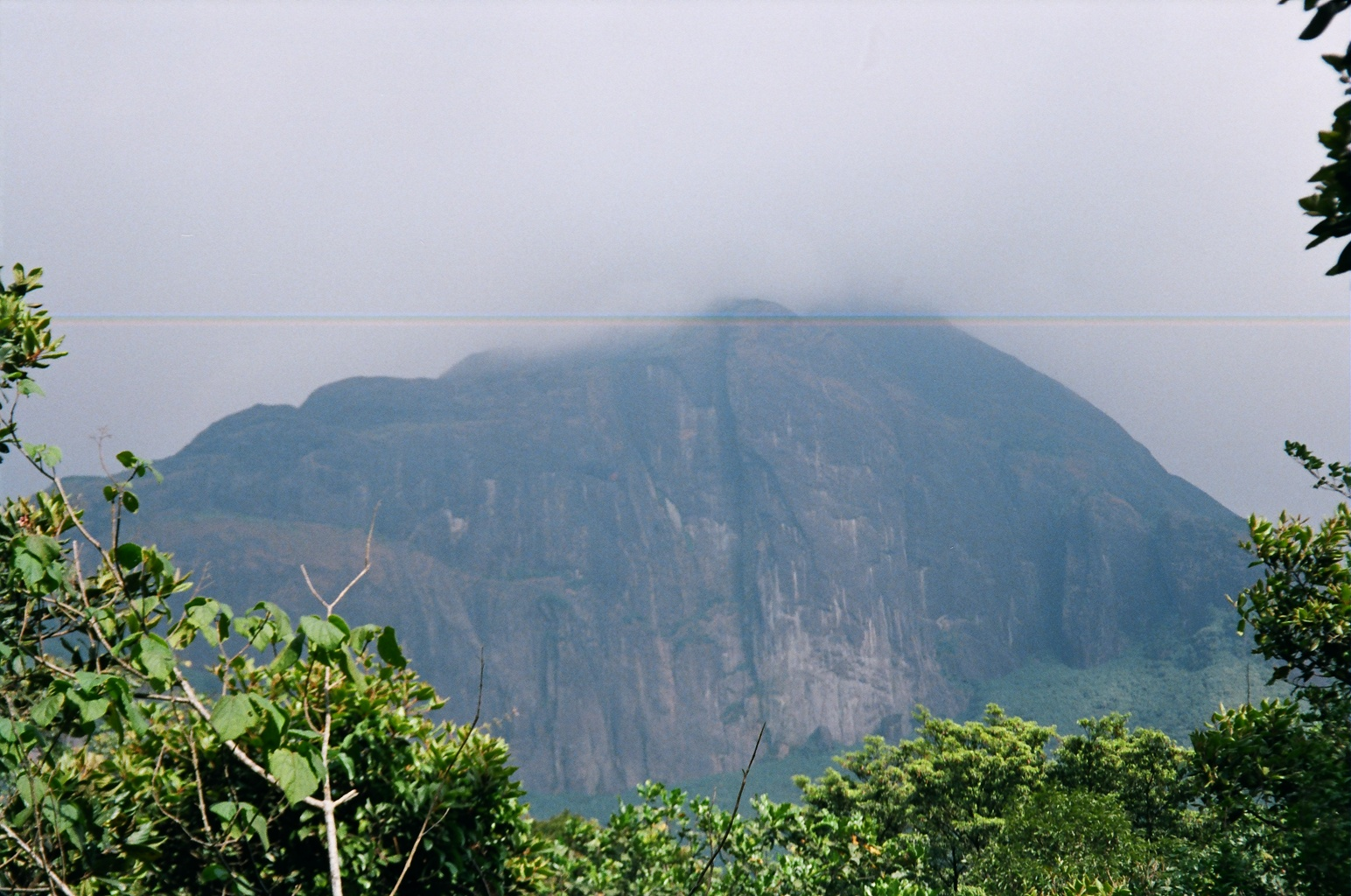
Agasthyamalai peak in Kerala/Tamil Nadu

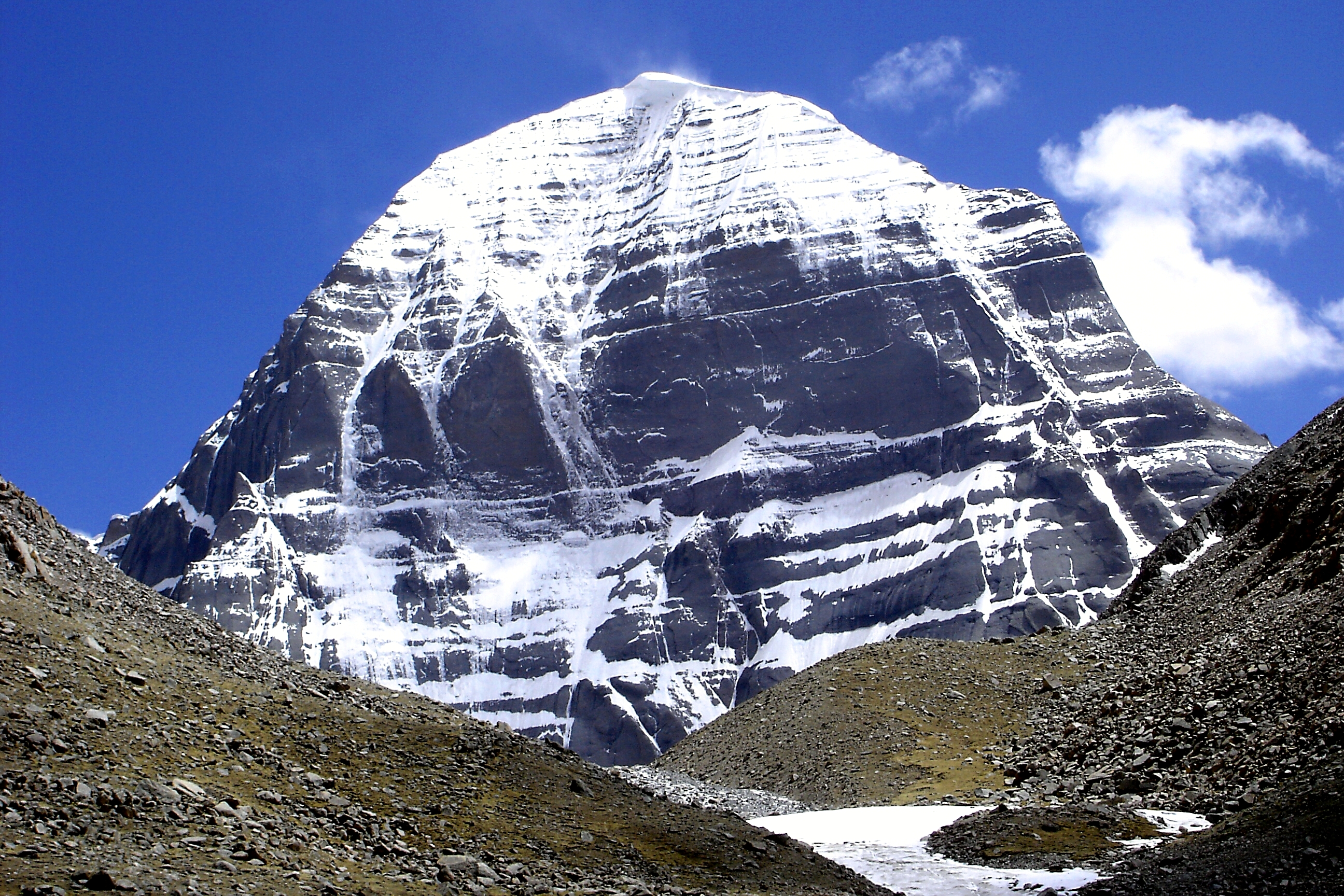
Mount Kailash in Tibet

While Swami Arulananda was at Pothigai hills, he often visited Subramania Swami temple in Tiruchendur. In 1981, on Thaipusam day (Full moon day in January), Agastya Maharishi appeared in Swamiji’s dream and asked him to proceed to Suruli Aandavar temple (Subramania Swami temple) at Suruli hills to practice Tapas. In this place, Subramania manifests as Suruli Aandavar.

Suruli Velappar Temple in praise of Kartikeya is located near the falls. This temple is shaped like an OM Pranava. OM is the source mantra of the universal. This Mantra was sounded prior to earth and all planets were created. We can hear the OM Mantra if you are in high level meditation frequency. This statement was told by Omgara guru Sidhar.

800 m (2,600 ft) above the fall is the Kailasanathar Cave Temple. At Kailasanathar cave many Sidhars meditate at a natural spring with waters having medicinal powers. Now, many Meykanda Devar's souls are there. Kailasanathar cave is connected with the Sathura Giri Mahalingam Kovil Cave. The Palani temple Murugan statue was built by Bogar with Navapasana (a unique medicine made from nine poisons). The bogar installed the statue before he came to Kailasnathar temple. Here he took many Herbals and constructed the Murugan's Navapasana Statue.

The Syed Sadai Masthan and Buhari Shaib Dargah at Suruli is an important worship place for Muslims. Syed Sadai Masthan cave is placed at opposite hills top side. Now, the forest Department is not given permission to worship there. Every 14 April Muslim people gather the Buhari Sahib Dhargah which placed at entrance of Suruli Falls. Both saints came to India to spread Islam in the Western Ghats area of Sivagiri and Suruli Falls.

== India-based Neutrino Observatory ==
In November 2009, Minister of Environment and Forests, Jairam Ramesh, in a letter to Anil Kakodkar, Secretary, Department of Atomic Energy (India) (DAE) and Chairman, Atomic Energy Commission of India (AEC), denied permission for the Department of Atomic Energy to set up the India-based Neutrino Observatory (INO) project at Singara in Nilgiris, as it falls in the buffer zone of the Mudumalai Tiger Reserve (MTR).

Instead, he suggested an alternate site near Suruli Falls. The Minister said this site did not pose the same problems that Singara posed and environmental and forest clearances should not be a serious issue. He also assured the DAE that the Ministry would facilitate necessary approvals for the alternative location. Dr. Naba K. Mondal of the Tata Institute of Fundamental Research, who is the spokesperson for the INO project said:

"But Suruliyar too is in a reserve forest area that is dense and would require cutting down of trees, something that was not required at Singara. Can the government assure us that clearance for this site will be given?" he asks. "Alternatively, we can move to the nearby Thevaram, which is about 20–30 km (12–19 mi) away from the Suruliyar falls. This forest area has only shrubs but there is no source of water here and water will have to be piped over a distance of 30 km (19 mi),"

== See also ==
- List of waterfalls
- List of waterfalls in India
