= Cumbum Valley =

Valley in Tamil Nadu, India

Coordinates: 9.739973°N 77.281267°E

Cumbum Valley, also called Kambam Valley, is a valley in the Theni district of Tamil Nadu state in India near the Kerala state border. This is the most fertile valley in south India. The valley includes lands between Thekkadi Hills, Varusanadu Hills, and Kodaikanal Hills.

It is one of the few places in Tamil Nadu producing grapes. Cumbum valley produces about 90,000 tonnes of muscat grapes and 10,000 tonnes of Thomson seedless grapes every year.

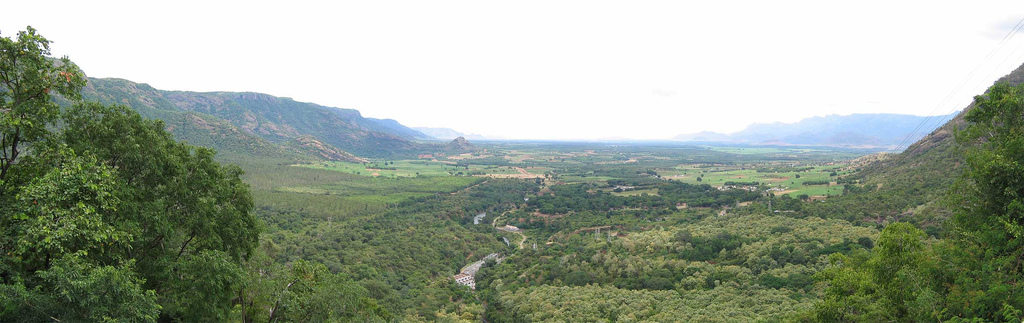

== Places ==
1. Cumbum
2. Uthamapalayam
3. Chinnamanur
4. Gudalur
5. Lower Camp
6. Surulipatti
7. Kamaya Koundan Patti
8. Hanumanthanpatty
9. Pudupatty
10. Rayappanpatty
11. Anaimalayanpatty
12. Ramasamynayakkanpatti
13. Paramathevanpatti
