= Vaigai River =

River in Tamil Nadu, India

Coordinates: 9°21′N 79°00′E

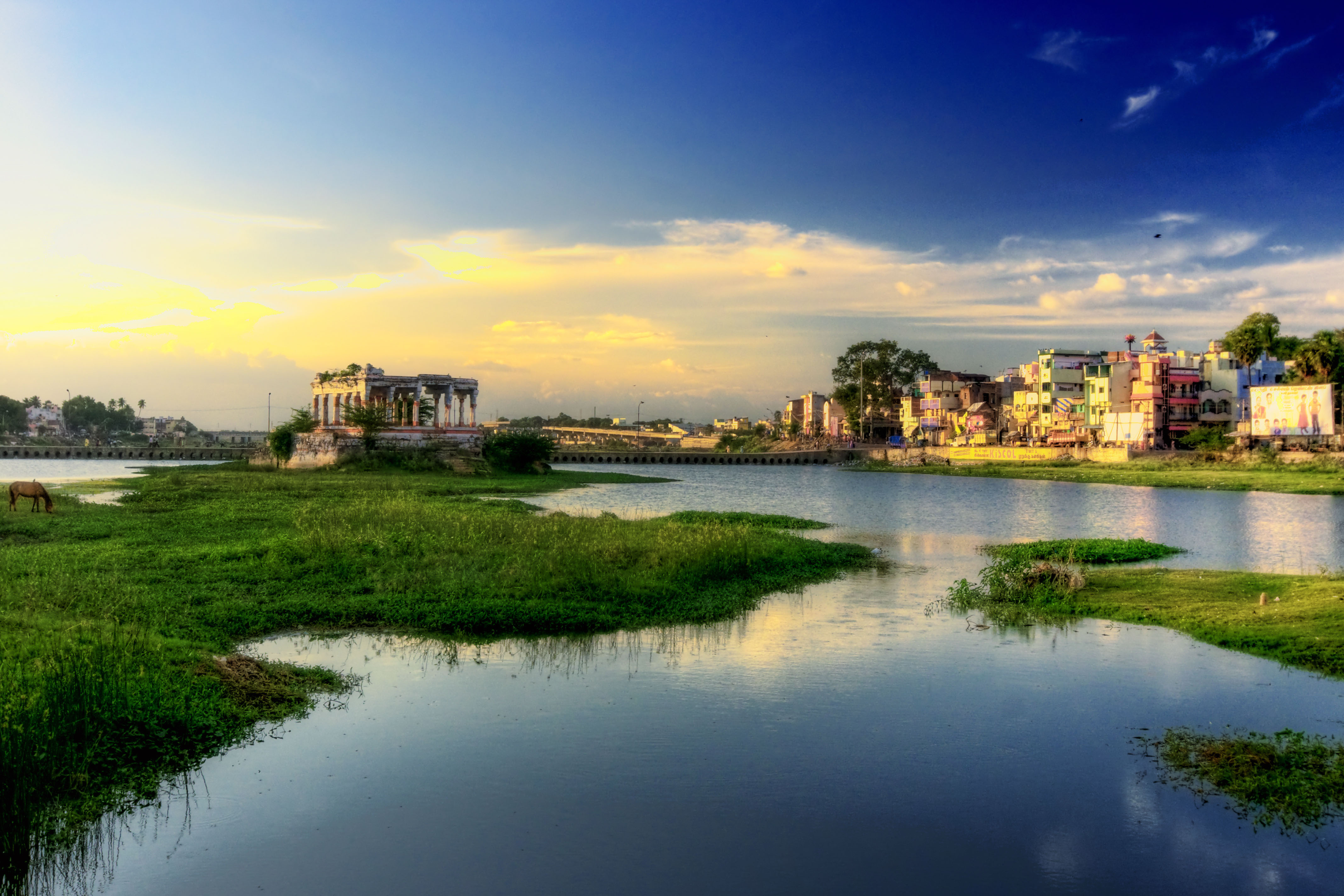
- Vaigai River in Madurai

- Map of Vaigai river

Location
- Country: India
- Districts: Theni; Dindigul; Madurai; Sivagangai; Ramanathapuram

Physical characteristics
- Source: Varusanadu hills
  - location: Tamil Nadu, India
- Mouth
  - location: Palk Bay
  - elevation: 0 m (0 ft)
- Length: 295 km (183 mi)
- Discharge
  - location: Peranai
  - average: 28.8 m^{3}/s (1,020 cu ft/s)

Vaigai is a semi-perennial river in the Indian state of Tamil Nadu. It flows through the districts of Theni, Dindigul, Madurai, Sivagangai, and Ramanathapuram in the southern part of the state. The city of Madurai is situated on the banks of the river. The river is 295 km (183 mi) long, with its drainage basin spread across 7,009 km^{2} (2,706 sq mi).

Vaigai originates in Varusanadu Hills of the Western Ghats, and flows north through the Cumbum Valley, between the Palani Hills to the north and the Varusanadu Hills to the south. It rounds the eastern corner of the Varushanad Hills, and turns southeast, running through southern Tamil Nadu. The river empties into the Palk Bay near Alagankulam in the Ramanathapuram district. During the 20th century, the river basin was extensively developed for irrigation, flood control, and the generation of hydroelectric power.

== Etymology ==
There are two etymologies for the name 'Vaigai'. The first is derived from a combination of two Tamil language words, 'vai' meaning Earth and 'yai' meaning sky, a reference to the mythology associated with the origin of the river. As per Koodal Purana, which details the origin of the Vaigai river flowing through Madurai, Vishnu took the form of Trivikrama, with one of his feet rising to the Brahmaloka, the abode of Brahma, in the skies. Brahma washed the raised foot and the water flowed into a rivulet. As the river came from the sky and fell onto Earth, it was called as 'Vaiyai', which later became 'Vaigai'. The river is mentioned as such in various Sangam literary works (circa 300 BCE to 300 CE), such as the Paripatal. A large number of banana trees sprang up in the place and it came to be known as Kadhalivana, a forest of banana trees. The second etymology is derived from the words 'vai' meaning keep, and 'kai' meaning hand, literally meaning 'the river that brings water when one touches it'.

The river is mentioned in Sanskrit as 'Kritamala'. Satyavrata, a Pandya king, was a staunch devotee of Vishnu. Vishnu emerged from the 'Kritimala' river as a fish (Matsya avatar, one of the avatars of Vishnu) to teach the Vedas to the ruler. The Pandyas later adopted the fish as the ensign of their kingdom. In the Sanskrit texts, the river is also mentioned as Vegavatī.

== Course ==
The Vaigai is a 295 km (183 mi) long semi-perennial river. The river originates in the eastern slopes of the Varusanadu Hills in the Western Ghats. It flows northwards for some distance, before it turns eastwards, and then flows roughly southeast till it reaches the Bay of Bengal at Palk Bay near Alagankulam. The river is at its peak volume during the monsoons, and often ends up dry in the summer.

=== Tributaries ===
The tributaries of the Vaigai include Suriliyar, Theniar, Varattar, Nagalar, Varahanadhi, Manjalar, Marudhanadhi, Sirumaliar, Sathaiyar, and Uppar. Suriliyar and Theniar join the river initially before it turns eastwards. Most of the tributaries including Varattar, Nagalar, Varahanadhi, Manjalar, Marudhanadhi, Sirumaliar, and Sathaiyar originate in the Palani and Sirumalai Hills and join the river along its course. Uppar originates in the Alagar hills and joins the Vaigai near Manamadurai.

== Riparian zone ==
The river has a 7,009 km^{2} (2,706 sq mi) drainage basin spread across the districts of Theni, Dindigul, Madurai, Sivagangai, and Ramanathapuram The basin stretches from the Western Ghats in the west to the Bay of Bengal in the east, and is bound by the Periyar basin in the west, Kaveri and Pambar-Kottakaraiyar basins to the north, and Gundar basin in the south. It is about 289–295 km (180–183 mi) long east-to-west and 15–55 km (9.3–34.2 mi) wide north-to-south.

The topography of the Vaigai watershed can be divided into three distinct regions: a western mountainous terrain with valley complexes, a central upland plateau, and an eastern flat coastal plains. The upper basin in the west lies in the Western Ghats, with elevations reaching up to about 2,600 m (8,500 ft) in the highest hills. Fertile valleys such as the Cumbum Valley lie between the hills and form important agricultural lowlands in this region. The middle basin around Madurai is relatively flatter, while the lower basin near Ramanathapuram consists of low-lying coastal plains. Major urban centers in the watershed include the city of Madurai on the river’s banks, as well as towns like Theni, Dindigul, and Ramanathapuram.

=== Soil and land use ===
The soils in the Vaigai basin consists of red soil in the Cumbum valley and nearby the Vaigai dam. Mixed red and sandy soil is found in select rocky areas. Black soil occurs areas around Andipatti, and lateritic soil is found in the slopes of the Palani Hills and north west of Manamadurai. The lower section of the basin predominantly consists of alluvial soil.

The land within the Vaigai River watershed is utilized for a mix of agriculture, forests, settlements, and other uses. Broadly, the basin's land consists of as one-third agricultural land, one-third forests, and one-third scrub/wasteland, with a small fraction under water bodies or urban areas. Agricultural lands cover 2,359 km^{2} (911 sq mi) of land area, and includes irrigated wet croplands concentrated in valley areas and near tanks, and dry croplands in the plains. About 30% of the watershed is forested, mainly in the western hilly region, and include medium to dense natural forests, and forest plantations.. A significant portion of the remaining land is classified as scrubland with sparse vegetation. There are many small water bodies in the Vaigai basin including man-made tanks and reservoirs, providing irrigation storage and groundwater recharge. The urban and built-up land occupies about 1–2% of the land area in the basin.

=== Dams ===
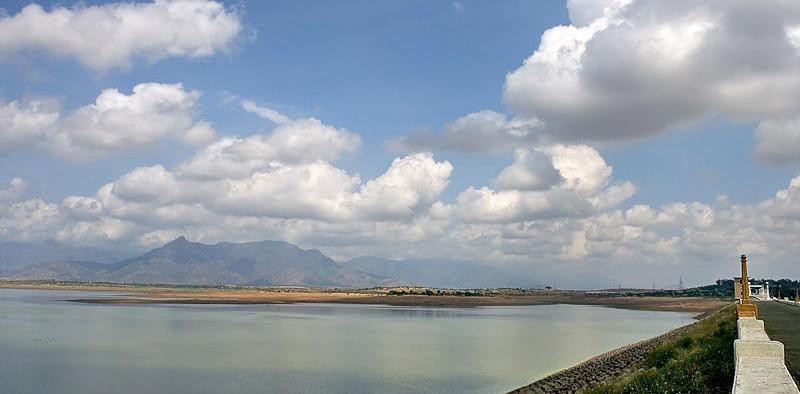
Vaigai Dam

The Vaigai Dam is built across the river in Periyakulam taluk, in the Theni district of Tamil Nadu. It provides water for irrigation for the six basin districts and the Virudhunagar district through irrigation canals. It is also the source of drinking water for Madurai. An agricultural research station, run by the Government of Tamil Nadu, is located near the dam.

The Mullaperiyar Dam, located in Idukki district in Kerala, was built in 1895 under the supervision of John Pennycuick, based on a plan proposed over a century earlier by Pradani Muthirulappa Pillai of Ramnad. An earlier dam was washed away by floods, post which the masonry dam was constructed in 1895. The dam is located on the Periyar River, and the water from the dam is diverted through Viravanar and Suriliyar to the Vaigai river during the monsoons.
