= Sadhar =

Town in Faisalabad District, Pakistan

- Town
- Location of Sadhar in Faisalabad in Punjab, Pakistan
- Coordinates: 31°25′45″N 73°4′44″E
- Country: Pakistan
- Region: Punjab
- District: Faisalabad District
- Official language: Urdu
- Native language: Punjabi
- First settled: 1892

Government
  - Type: Provincial Government
  - MPA: Rana Aftab Ahmed Khan (PTI)

Population
  - Estimate (2014): about 0.5 million
- Time zone: UTC+5 (Pakistan (PST))
  - Summer (DST): UTC+4 (PST)
- Area code: 041
- Vehicle registration: Three letters beginning with F and four random numbers (e.g. FDA 1234)

Sadhar is a town near Faisalabad, in central PunjabPakistan. The town is 6 kilometres (3.7 mi) from Faisalabad International Airport. It has a population of about 0.2 million.

== Livelihood ==
Sadhar's textile mills, which contain power looms, are the main source of livelihood for its middle-class citizens.

Some people, rely heavily on Agriculture for their income.

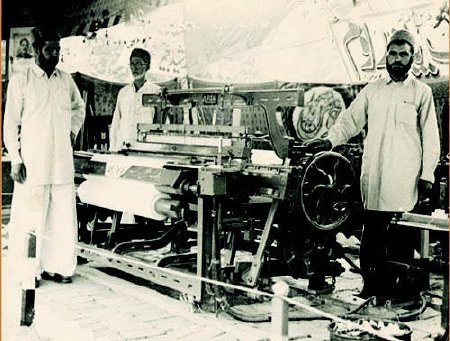
a power loom

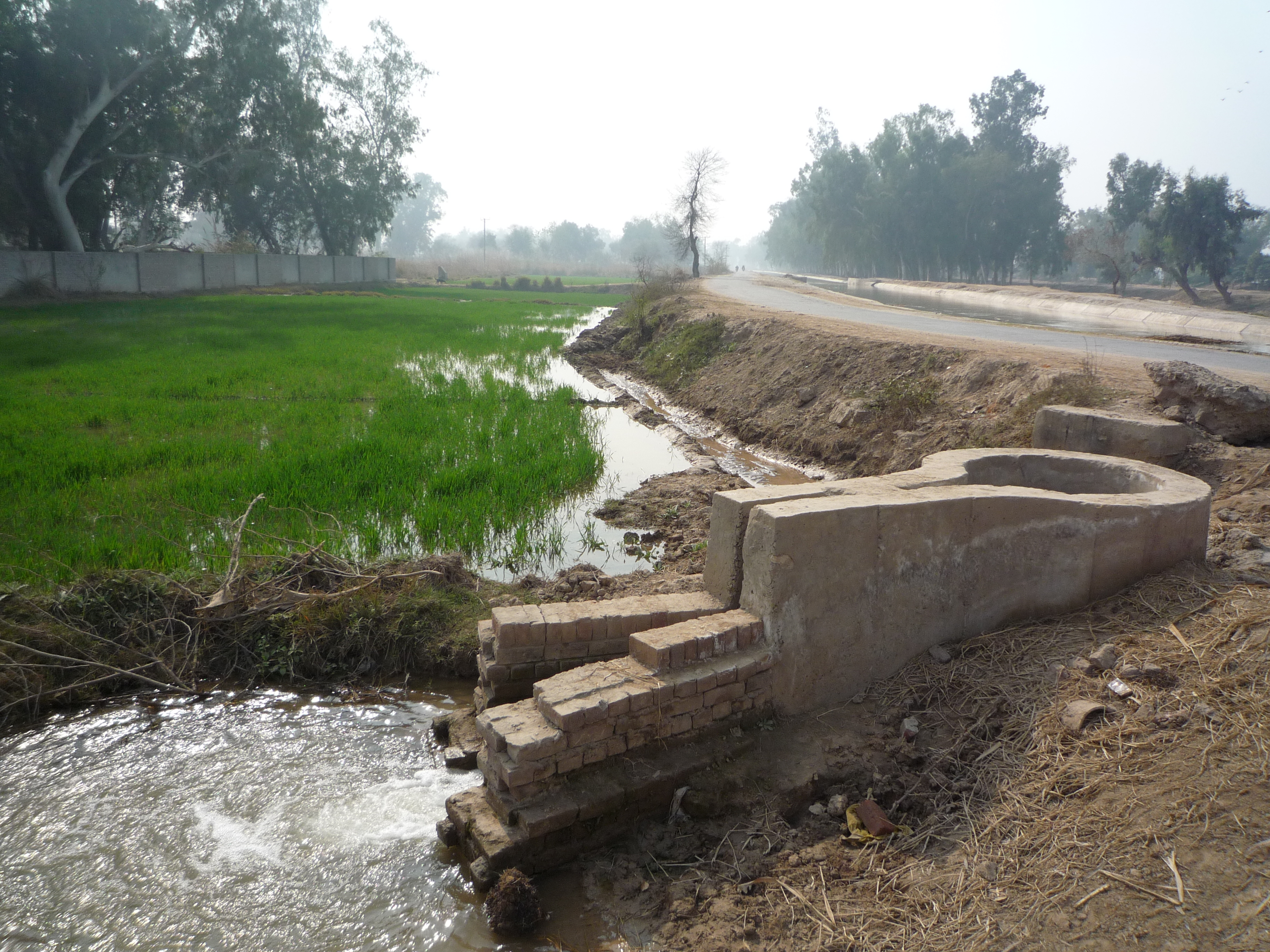
a field
