= Chinnamanur =

- Town
- Location in Tamil Nadu, India
- Coordinates: 9°50′27.748″N 77°23′5.105″E
- Country: India
- State: Tamil Nadu
- District: Theni
- Taluk: Uthamapalayam

Government
  - Type: Second Grade Municipality
  - Body: Chinnamanur Municipality

Area
  - Total: 27 km^{2} (10 sq mi)
- Elevation: 375 m (1,230 ft)

Population (2011)
  - Total: 42,305
  - Density: 1,600/km^{2} (4,100/sq mi)

Languages
  - Official: Tamil
- Time zone: UTC+5:30 (IST)
- Postal code: 625 515

Chinnamanur (historically known as Harikesarinallur), is a town and municipality in the Theni district of the Indian state of Tamil Nadu. Situated along the banks of the Mullai river, it is the second-largest town in the district by geographic area and the fourth-largest by its population, with the 2011 Census recording a population of 42,305.

Chinnamanur is a key educational and commercial hub for the rural population of nearly 100,000 people. The town's economy is driven by its banana processing and export industry, as well as a high concentration of retail jewellery markets.

== Geography ==
Chinnamanur is located at 9°50′N 77°23′E in the Theni district of Tamil Nadu. It is located at an average elevation of 375 metres (1,230 ft). Chinnamanur town is situated at 374 m above sea level. This town is situated on the banks of Mullai River, also known as the Suruliyar River. The town is also mentioned in the Tamil grammatical work, Tholkappiam.

== Demographics ==
Religious census
Religion	Percent(%)
Hindu	90.57%
Muslim	7.55%
Christian	1.81%
Other	0.05%
No religion	0.01%

According to 2011 census, Chinnamanur had a population of 42,305 with a sex-ratio of 1,007 females for every 1,000 males, much above the national average of 929. A total of 4,015 were under the age of six, constituting 2,120 males and 1,895 females. Scheduled Castes and Scheduled Tribes accounted for 17.08% and .03% of the population respectively. The average literacy of the town was 75.61%, compared to the national average of 72.99%. The town had a total of 11545 households. There were a total of 16,827 workers, comprising 430 cultivators, 3,840 main agricultural labourers, 405 in house hold industries, 10,845 other workers, 1,307 marginal workers, 41 marginal cultivators, 369 marginal agricultural labourers, 87 marginal workers in household industries and 810 other marginal workers.

As per the religious census of 2011, Chinnamanur had 90.57% Hindus, 7.55% Muslims, 1.81% Christians, 0.05% following other religions and 0.01% following no religion or did not indicate any religious preference.

== History ==
Chinnamanur holds a place of historical value in Tamil Nadu, particularly with the discovery of the Chinnamanur Copper Plates. These plates were mainly issued during the reigns of Pandyan monarchs, such as Rajasimha II, in the early Pandyan period. These royal charters are noted to have recorded land grants, genealogies, and military victories. The copper plates were recovered in the 1900s by the Madras Government, under British colonial rule. They are currently preserved at the British Museum, London.

The town's historical and cultural identity is shaped by the Thiru Poolanandeshwarar Temple, dedicated to Lord Shiva and his consort Sivakai Amman (Parvati). According to local accounts of temple tradition, the shrine originated under the rule of Pandyan king Rajasimha (Rajasimeshwaran).

The legend recounts the story of a local milkman, who often tripped over an irregular, stone-like tree root in the forest, leading to his milk being spilled on the forest floor at the same exact spot each day. Frustrated with the anomaly, the milkman attempts to chop the root with an axe. This reportedly led to the root beginning to bleed and the emergence of an intense beam of divine light.

When King Rajasimha was informed of the phenomenon, he travelled to the site in devotion. Being moved by the experience, he reportedly prayed for a manifestation of the divine power in a form that the common people could worship. Allegedly, this led to the appearance of a Shiva Lingam at the king's height. Tradition holds that the king held the deity in an embrace, leading to impressions of his royal ornaments on the Lingam. These markings are said to still remain visible today, when performing Deepa Aradhana (light offerings).

The presiding deity is known locally by a number of epithets:

- Rajasimeshwarar: Named in honor of King Rajasimeshwaran
- Palkonda Naadar: "The Lord Who Accepted Milk"
- Alavodu Alavanavar: "The Lord Who Accommodated the Height of a Humble Devotee"
- Tazhuva Kudaindavar: "The Lord Who Yielded to the Embrace of an Honest King"

== Culture ==
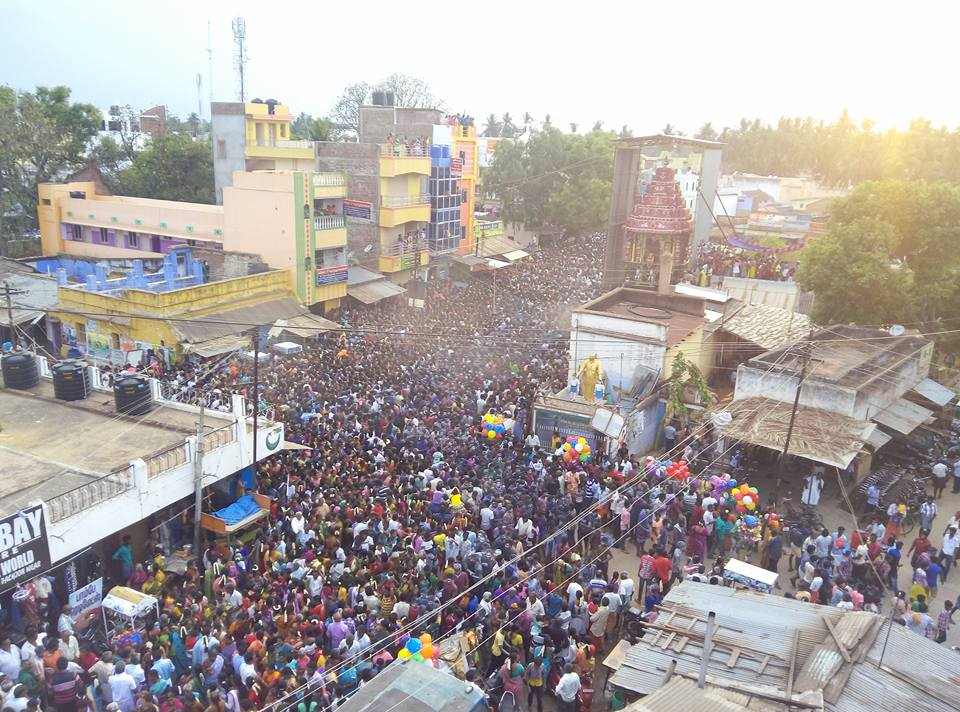
Chinnmanur Chithirai Festival

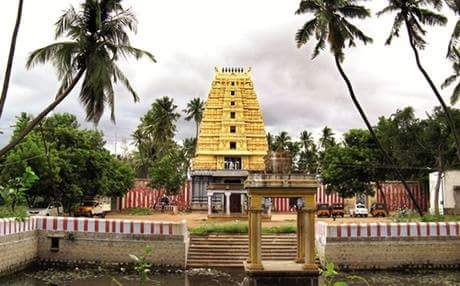
Sivakami Amman Temple Chinnamanur

Cultural life in Chinnamanur centres around annual religious celebrations. The Chithirai Festival is celebrated every year during April and May, with the main highlight being a grand temple car (Rath) procession in the main street. Another major event is Ganesh Chaturthi, celebrated for a three day period. The festival includes a large procession of 180 Ganesha idols across the town, moving to the western edge of Chinnamanur before concluding with immersion rituals at the Mulai River bridge.

The town features a prominent Muslim population belonging to the Rowther community, following the Hanafi school of Islamic jurisprudence. These communities are concentrated in certain neighbourhoods such as South Muslim Street (near K.K. Kulam), Vadakku Thaeru, and Saamikulam. The community has seen significant socio-economic growth in the recent decades with higher access to education, with a large number of professionals being engineers employed within India or abroad. Major places of worship for this community include the Periya Pallivasal (Mohammad Nainarsha Mosque or "Big Mosque"), the Cinna Masjid (Cinna Pallivasal or "Small Masjid"), and the Samikulam Pallivasal.

The local Christian community is served by several churches across different denominations, which include the Roman Catholic Church, the Church of South India (CSI), Bethel Church India, and the Maranatha Church.

== Schools ==
Chinnamanur is one of the primary educational hubs for the rural regions in Theni District. The town hosts a variety of primary, secondary, and tertiary institutions run by both private and government-aided sectors.

Secondary education is mainly serviced by government institutions, such as K.A. Boys Higher Secondary School and K.V.A. Girls Higher Secondary School. Private matriculation higher secondary schools include Gayathri Matriculation, C.N.M.S.S. and The Mayoor Ram Matriculation School. The areas of primary and middle school education is provided by Kurukkal Middle School, Anna Memorial Middle School, and Saraswathi Vidhyalaya, alongside dual language medium (Tamil and English) schools like Nalli Matriculation and Thai Matriculation School.

Higher and technical education is mainly provided by an Arts and Science College on the eastern outskirts of the town, while the V.O.C. Industrial Training Institute (ITI) provides vocational and technical training.
