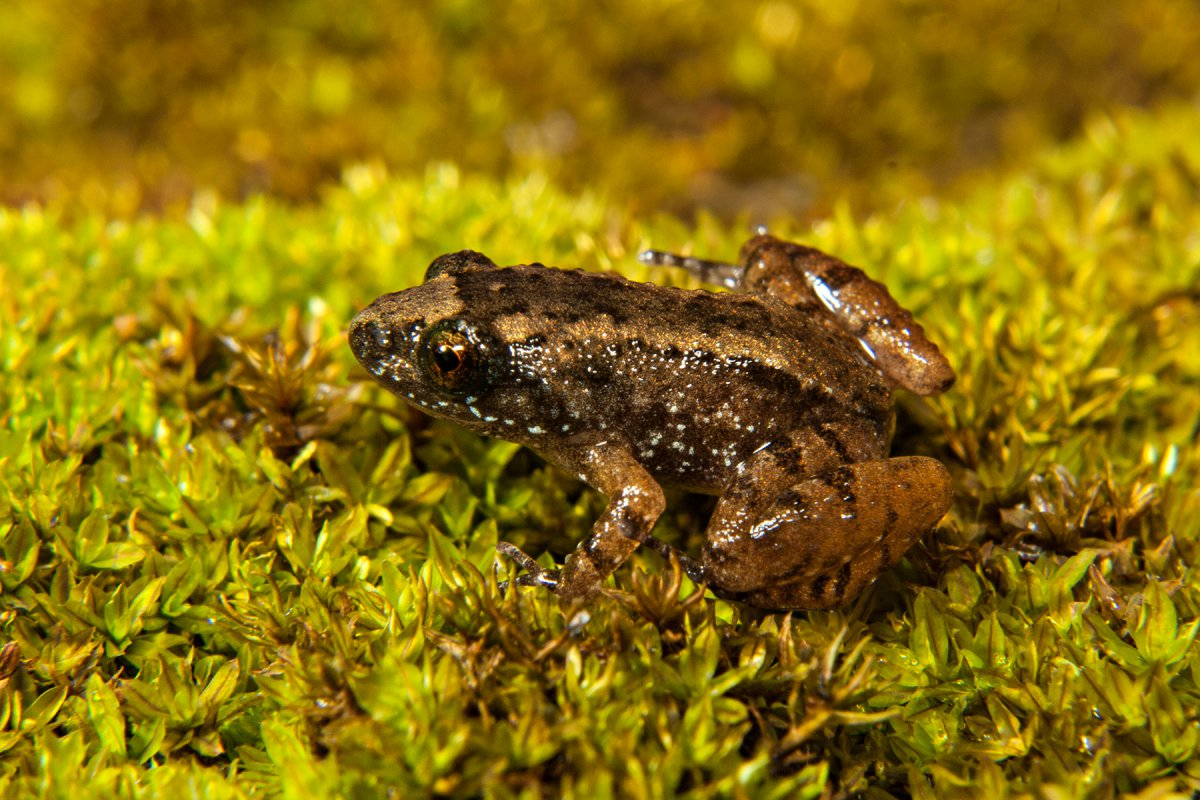

Scientific classification
- Kingdom: Animalia
- Phylum: Chordata
- Class: Amphibia
- Order: Anura
- Family: Nyctibatrachidae
- Genus: Nyctibatrachus
- Species: N. anamallaiensis

Binomial name
- Nyctibatrachus anamallaiensis (Myers, 1942)

Synonyms
- Nannobatrachus anamallaiensis Myers, 1942

= Nyctibatrachus anamallaiensis =

Anamallai night frog

Species of amphibian

Nyctibatrachus anamallaiensis, the Anamallai night frog, is a species of frog in the family Nyctibatrachidae that is endemic to the southern Western Ghats, India. It is only known from the vicinity of its type locality, Valparai in Anaimalai Hills, Tamil Nadu. It was for a long time considered to be a synonym of Nyctibatrachus beddomii.

Nyctibatrachus anamallaiensis is a small species, reaching a snout–vent length of only 17 mm (0.67 in). The type series is from a marshy pasture through which a small stream was running; the specimens were found in and near the water.
