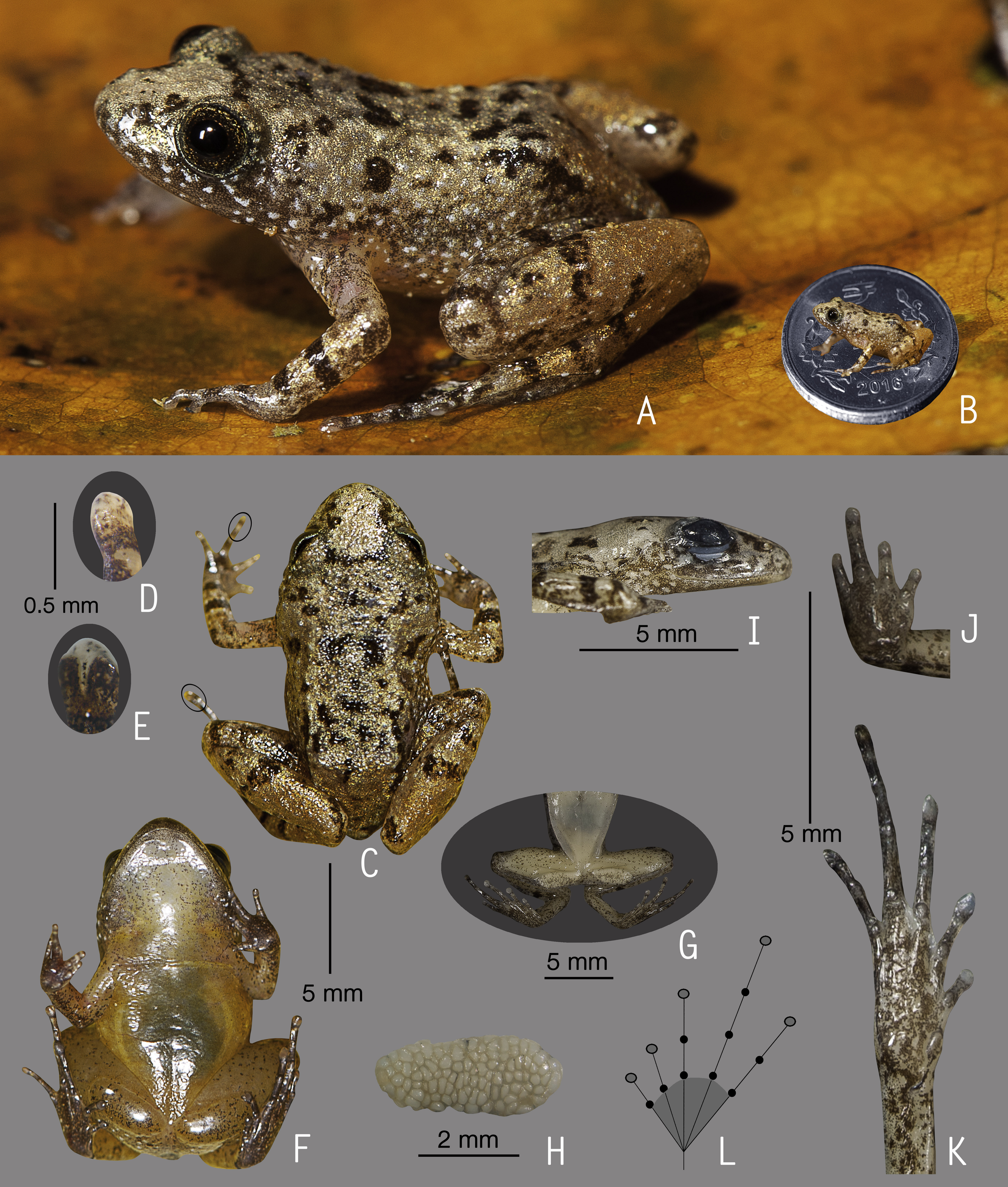

Scientific classification
- Kingdom: Animalia
- Phylum: Chordata
- Class: Amphibia
- Order: Anura
- Family: Nyctibatrachidae
- Genus: Nyctibatrachus
- Species: N. pulivijayani

Binomial name
- Nyctibatrachus pulivijayani Garg, Suyesh, Sukesan, and Biju, 2017

= Nyctibatrachus pulivijayani =

Species of frog

Nyctibatrachus pulivijayani, or Vijayan's night frog, is a species of night frogs, family Nyctibatrachidae. The frog is endemic to the Western Ghats, India, and is only known from its type locality, Pandipath, in the Agasthyamalai Hills, Thiruvananthapuram district, Kerala. Smaller than a human fingernail, it is among the smallest frog species in the world. Nyctibatrachus pulivijayani is part of a genus that evolved in India around 70–80 million years ago. The species of frog was discovered by scientists from the University of Delhi.

== Etymology ==
The specific name pulivijayani honours Mr. Vijayan Kani, who supported Biju and his students during their field campaigns. He got the name Pulivijayan after braving a leopard attack (puli is Malayalam for "leopard"). The word puli can also allude to leopard-like spots on the dorsal surface of this species.

== Description ==
Five adult males in the type series measure 13.3–14.9 mm (0.5–0.6 in) in snout–vent length; no females were collected. The snout is rounded. The tympanum is indistinct. The fingers and toes have discs but no webbing. The dorsum is light brown to silvery-brown and has prominent dark brown spots. The venter is light yellowish-brown with minute black speckles. The hands and feet are darker. The throat is light grey. Weakly developed dorso-lateral glandular folds are present and re separated by scattered granular projections.

== Habitat ==
The type locality is an evergreen forest at 1,250 m (4,100 ft) above sea level. Specimens were found hiding under herbs and grasses on marshy ground, usually away from water. Males were observed calling both during the day and in the late evening.
