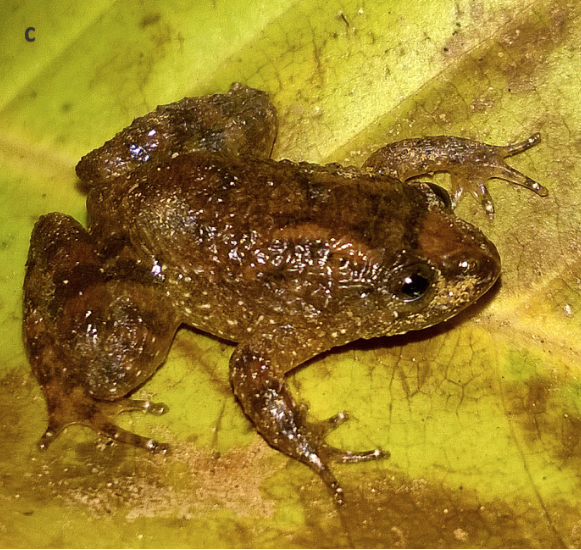
- Male
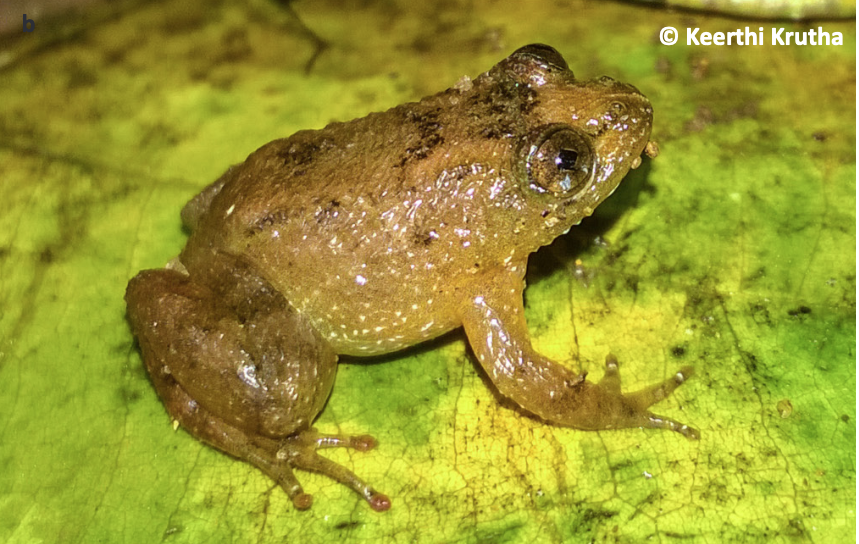
- Female

Scientific classification
- Kingdom: Animalia
- Phylum: Chordata
- Class: Amphibia
- Order: Anura
- Family: Nyctibatrachidae
- Genus: Nyctibatrachus
- Species: N. mewasinghi

Binomial name
- Nyctibatrachus mewasinghi Krutha, Dahanukar, and Molur, 2017
- Map showing N. mewasinghi's known distribution in the southern Western Ghats

= Nyctibatrachus mewasinghi =

Species of frog

Nyctibatrachus mewasinghi, also known as Mewa Singh's night frog or the Peruvannamuzhi wrinkled frog, is a species of frog in the robust frog family Nyctibatrachidae. It was described in 2017 by the herpetologist Keerthi Krutha and her colleagues. A small frog, it has an adult snout–vent length of 21.4–23 mm (0.84–0.91 in). It is mainly light greyish-brown above and off-white below, with a triangular light brown patch on the snout, light brown limbs with off-white undersides, and dark grey fingers and toes. It has scattered greyish-brown spots on the throat and the underside of the limbs. When preserved in ethanol, it has a more faded colour.

The species is endemic to the Western Ghats of India, where it is known only from the Malabar Wildlife Sanctuary in Kerala, where the specimens used to describe the species were originally collected. It is known from streams with plant cover at elevations of around 38 m (125 ft). It has not yet been assessed by the IUCN.

== Taxonomy ==
Nyctibatrachus mewasinghi was described in 2017 by the herpetologist Keerthi Krutha and her colleagues based on an adult female specimen collected from the village of Peruvannamuzhi in the Malabar Wildlife Sanctuary in the state of Kerala. The species is named after the Indian primatologist and ethologist Mewa Singh to honour his contributions to the study and conservation of Indian primates.

The species is one of 34 species in the night frog genus Nyctibatrachus, in the robust frog family Nyctibatrachidae. It is sister (most closely related) to N. athirappillyensis, and both of these species are further sister to N. kempholeyensis. The following cladogram shows relationships among the three species, according to the 2017 study that described the species.

- Nyctibatrachus
  - N. kempholeyensis
  - - N. mewasinghi
    - N. athirappillyensis

== Description ==
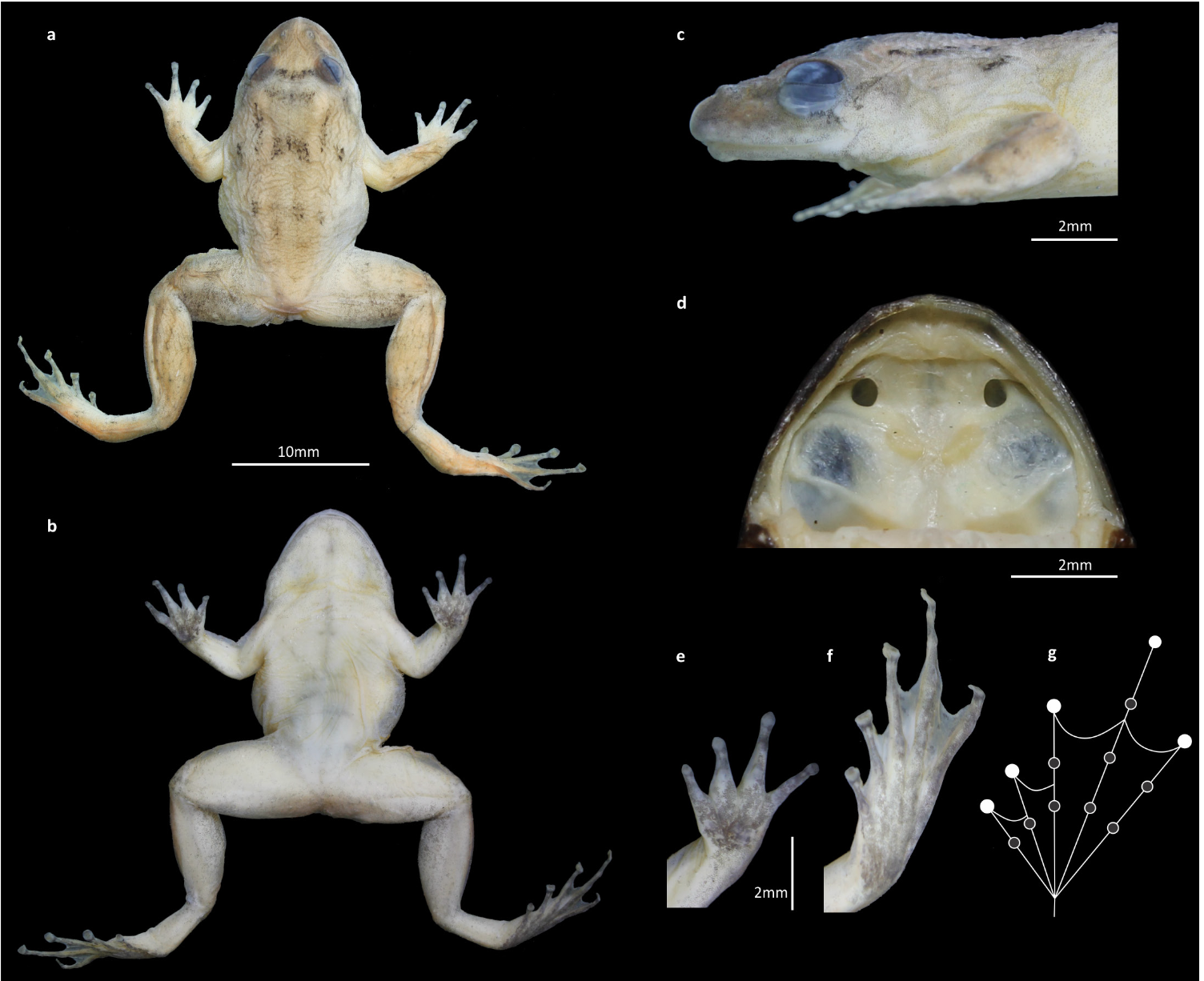
Figure showing different aspects of the species' morphology when preserved

N. mewasinghi is a small frog, with a snout–vent length of 21.9–22.3 mm (0.86–0.88 in) for adult males and 21.4–23 mm (0.84–0.91 in) for females. The width and length of the head are similar, and the snout is ovoid and longer than the diameter of the eye. Males can be distinguished from females by the presence of a prominent femoral gland (a bulbous gland near the inner thigh).

In adult females, the upperside is light greyish-brown, with a pair of light reddish-brown bands running from behind the eyelids to the middle of the back. The snout has a triangular light brown patch, demarcated by a dark stripe between the eyes. The margins of the upper and lower jaws are grayish, with glandular projections on the lower jaw. The side of the body is slightly lighter than the back, and the underside is mainly off-white, with some scattered greyish-brown spots on the throat. The limbs are light brown with horizontal dark brown bands above and off-white with scattered greyish-brown spots below. The fingers and toes are dark grey, with dark brown bands across the upper side. When preserved in 70% ethanol, the frog has a more faded colour and the bands along the back are cream to light brown.

N. mewasinghi can be distinguished from its congeners by a combination of its small snout–vent length; the head being almost as wide or slightly wider than it is long; a prominent Y-shaped ridge from the upper lip to the nostrils; weakly wrinkled skin on the upper sides with prominent granular projections; the absence of glandular folds on the sides of the back; the presence of the dorso-terminal groove (groove on the upper side of the tip of the digit) on the third finger and fourth toe; the discs on the third finger and fourth toe being well-developed and slightly wider than the finger and toe, respectively; two tubercles on the palm; small webbing; the thigh being almost as long as the lower leg; and the lower leg being almost as long as the foot.

== Distribution, ecology, and conservation ==
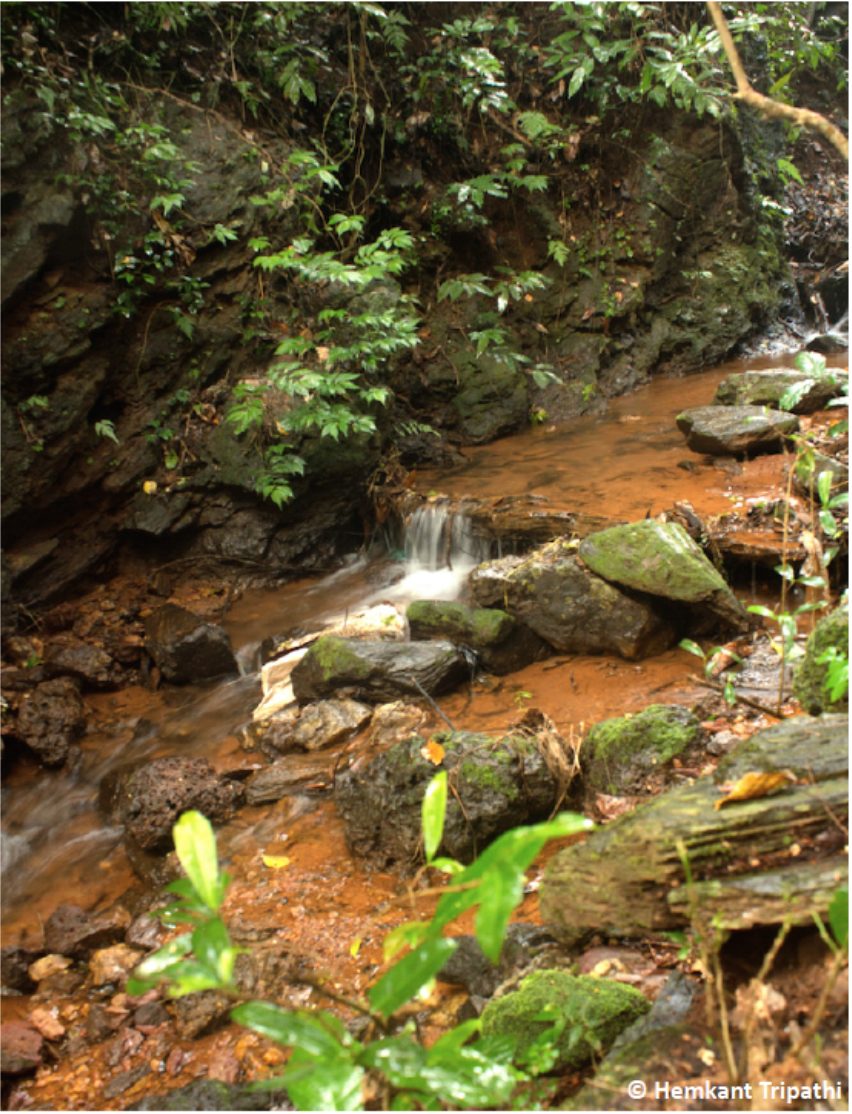
Type locality of N. mewasinghi

N. mewasinghi is endemic to the Western Ghats of India, where it is known only from the Malabar Wildlife Sanctuary in Kerala, north of the Palakkad Gap. The specimens used to describe the species were collected from a stream with plant cover, running alongside a wall ahead of a drain releasing excess water from the Peruvannamuzhi Dam, and were at an elevation of 38 m (125 ft). Males have been observed vocalising from rocks and leaves around 5:00 PM. The species has not yet been assessed by the IUCN.
