= Indian Institute of Spices Research =

Agricultural research organisation

- Former names: Regional Station of CPCRI; National Research Centre for Spices (NRCS)
- Type: Autonomous
- Established: 1975; 51 years ago
- Director: Dr. R. Dinesh
- Location: Kozhikode, Kerala, India; 11.29395°N 75.82038°E
- Campus: Marikkunnu, Kozhikode
- Nickname: IISR
- Website: IISR
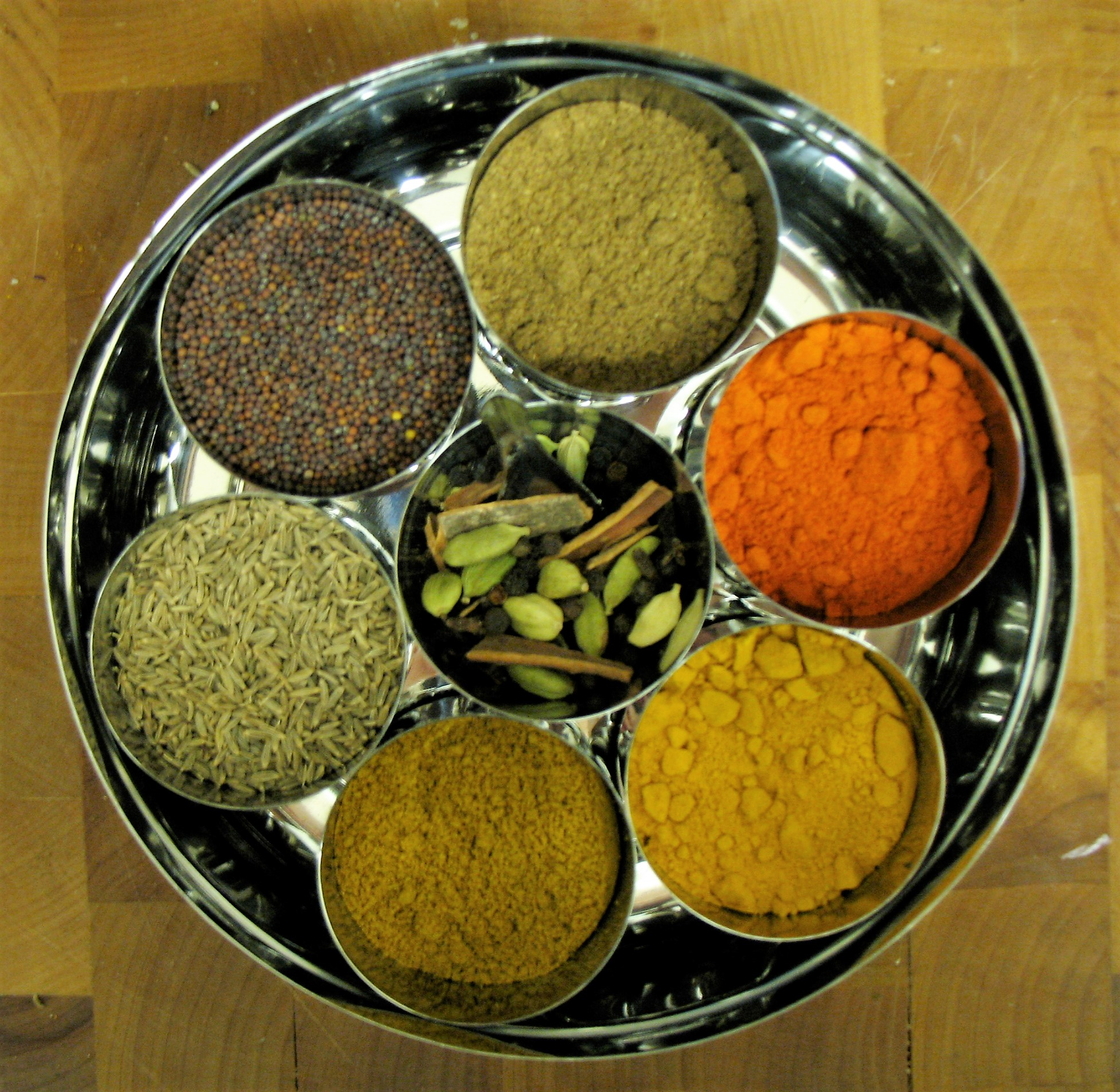

The Indian Institute of Spices Research (IISR) is an autonomous organisation engaged in agricultural research related to spices in India. The institute has its headquarters in Moozhikkal, Silver Hills, Kozhikode, Kerala and is a subsidiary of Indian Council of Agricultural Research (ICAR), New Delhi, under the Ministry of Agriculture, India.

== History ==
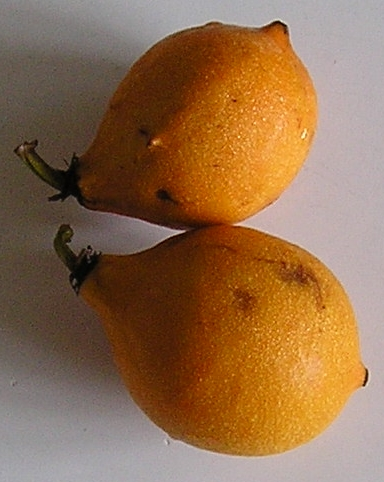

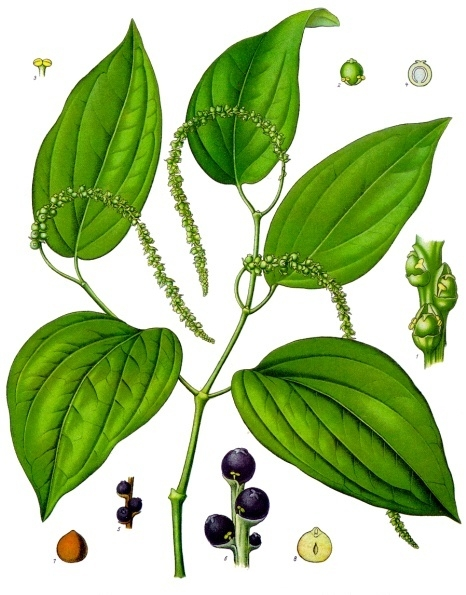

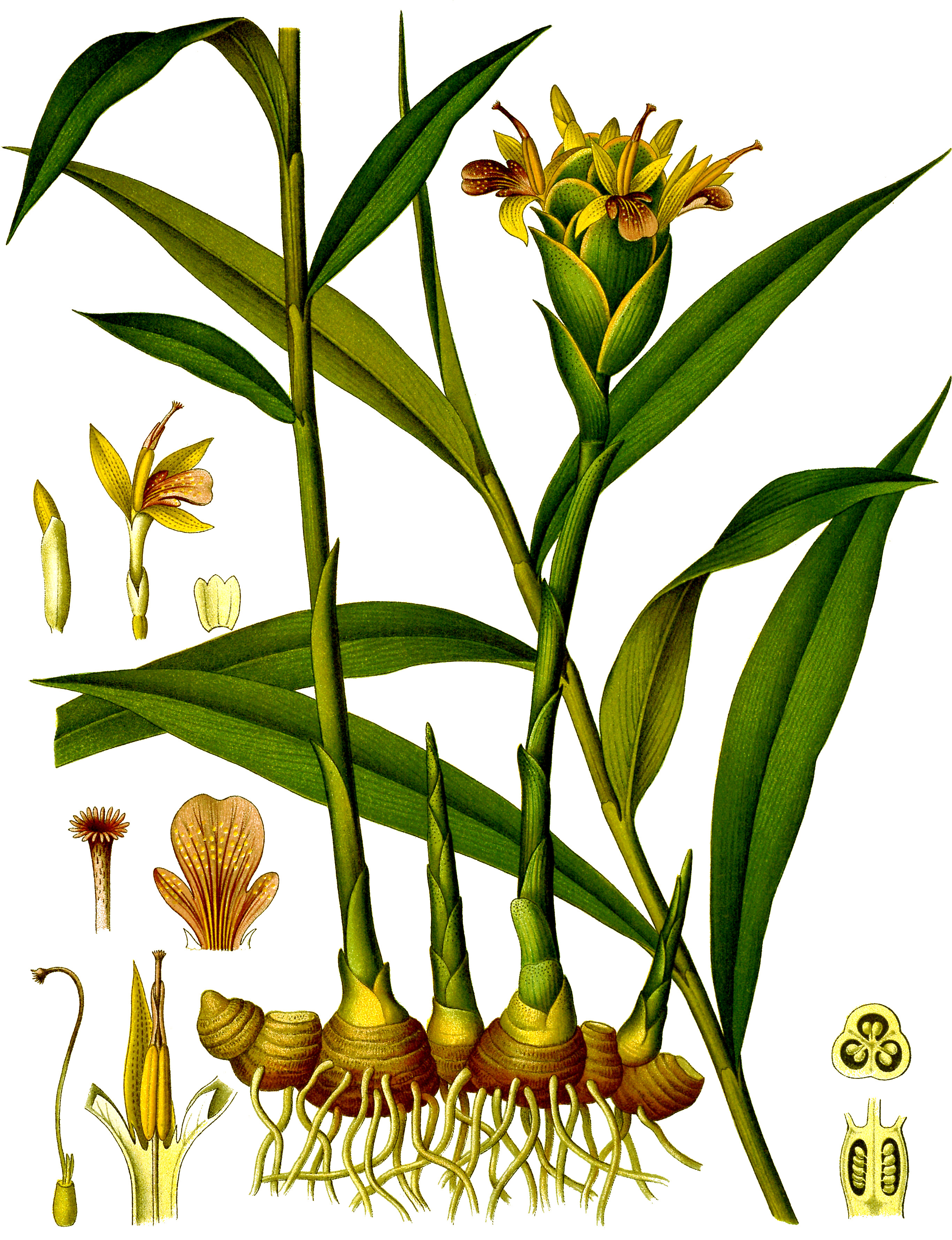

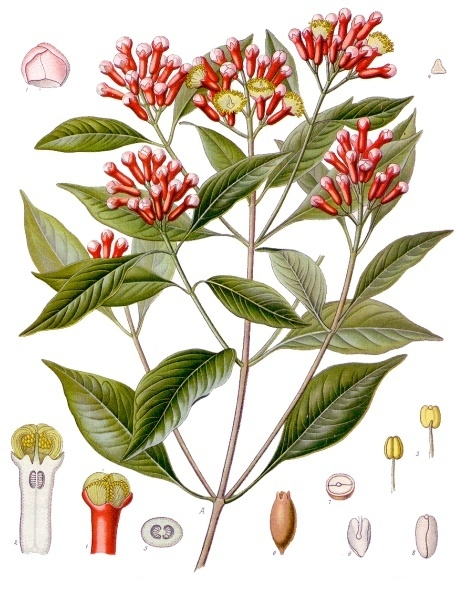

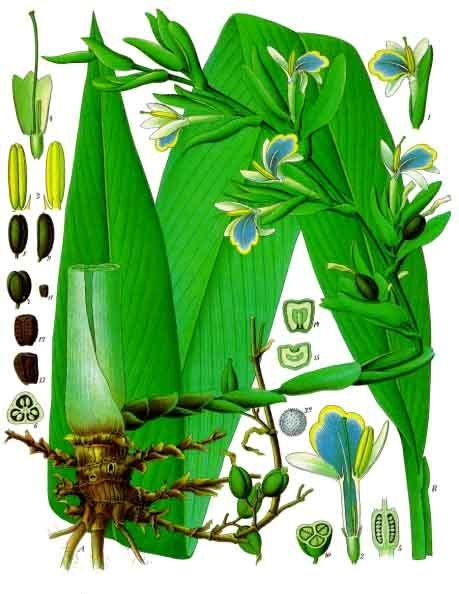

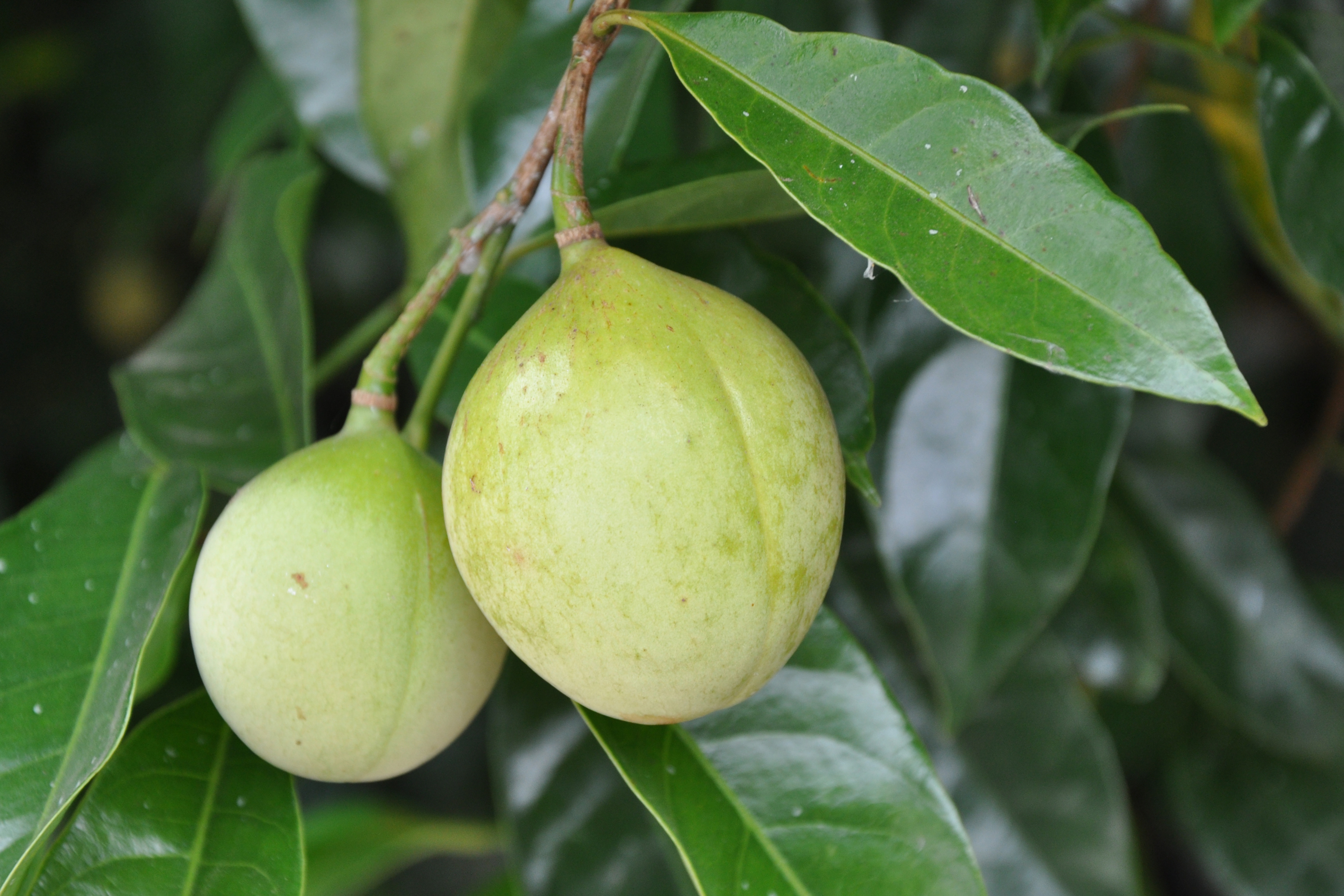

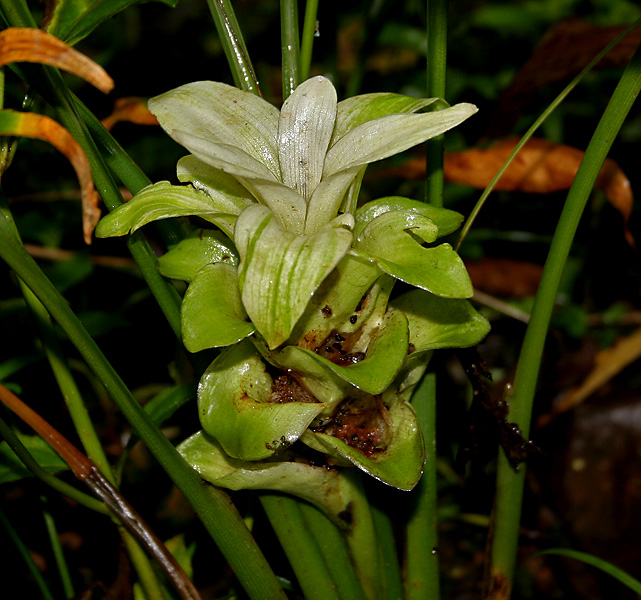

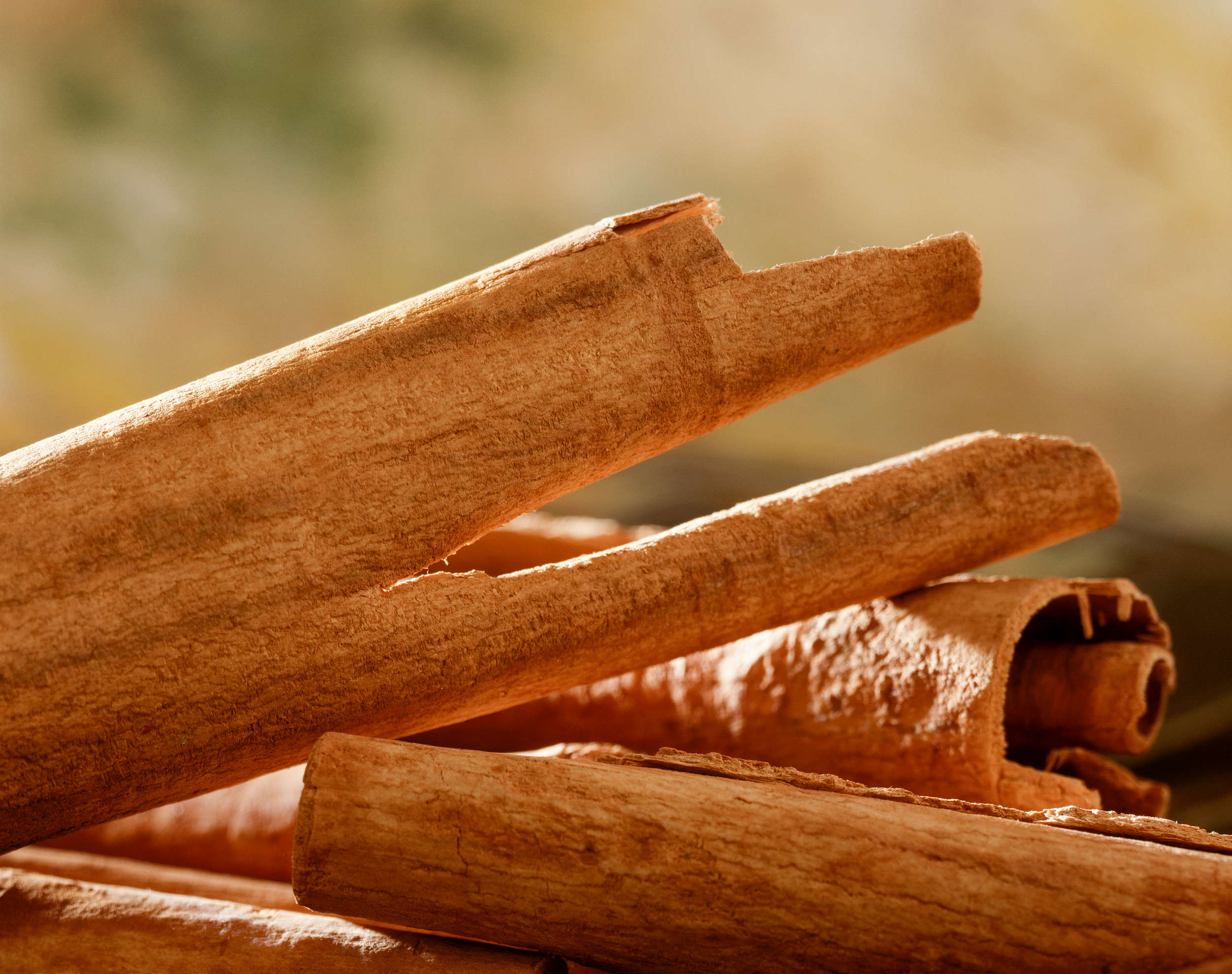

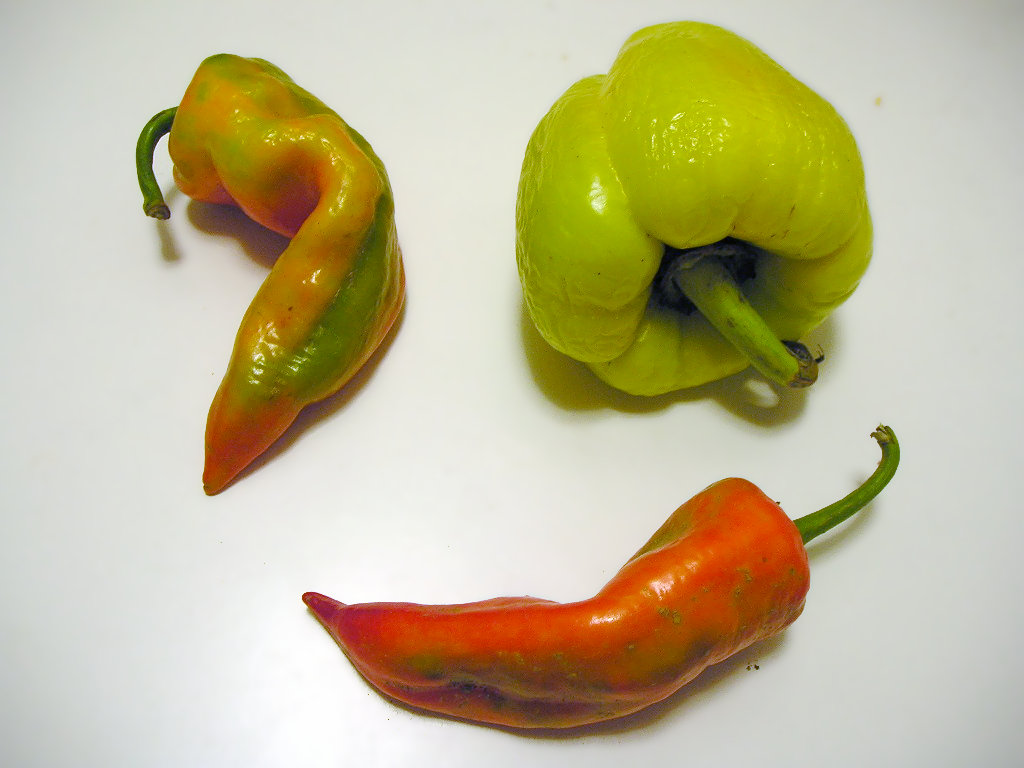

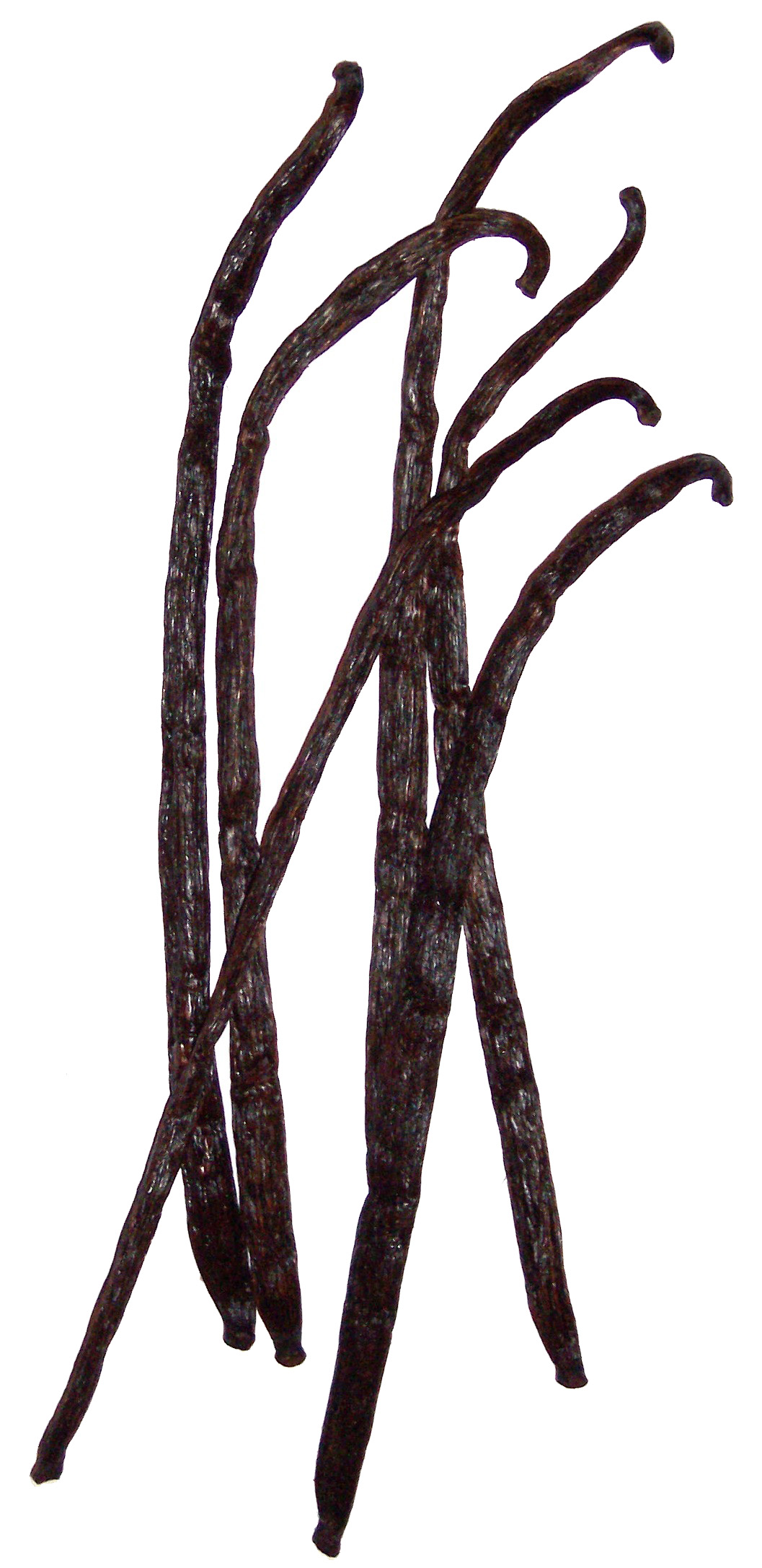

ICAR, in 1971, launched a project, All India Coordinated Spices and Cashew Improvement Project (AICSCIP) at Central Plantation Crops Research Institute (CPCRI) at Kasaragod, Kerala to initiate research activities for the development of spice crops. Later, the project was upgraded as a Regional station and the base was shifted to Kozhikode in 1975. In 1986, ICAR merged the station with Cardamom Research Centre of CPCRI located at Appangala, Karnataka under the name, National Research Centre for Spices (NRCS). NRCS was further upgraded in 1995 as the Indian Institute of Spices Research.

== Mandate ==
IISR was formed with a five-fold mandate :

Target group : Farmers & Planters Mandate : To extend services and technologies to conserve genetic resources of spices as well as soil, water and air of spices agro ecosystems. Programs :

- Collection, conservation, characterization and cataloguing of germplasm of spice crops for yield and other economically important characters.
- System approach for sustainable production of spices.

Target group : Farmers, Planters & Industries Mandate : To develop high yielding and high quality spice varieties and sustainable production and protection systems using traditional and non-traditional techniques and novel biotechnological approaches. Programs :

- Breeding improved varieties of spice crops for yield, quality, drought and resistance to pests and diseases through conventional and molecular approaches.
- Identification, characterization and development of diagnostics against pests, pathogens nematodes of spice crops.
- Developing integrated pest and disease management strategies in spice crops.
- Systems approach for sustainable production of spices.
- Production of nucleus planting materials of improved varieties of spice crops.

Target group : Farmers, Planters & Industries Mandate : To develop post harvest technologies of spices with emphasis on product development and product diversification for domestic and export purposes. Programs :

- Value addition and post harvest processing of spices
- Investigations on nutraceuticals and pharmacokinetics aspects of spices

Target group : Farmers, Planters, Researchers & Development Agencies Mandate : To act as a centre for training in research methodology and technology upgradation of spices and to coordinate national research projects. Programs :

- Extension and training
- Developing customized software and expert systems on spices

Target group : Farmers, Planters & Policy makers Mandate : To monitor the adoption of new and existing technologies to make sure that research is targeted to the needs of the farming community. Programs :

- Economics, Statistics and modeling
- Extension and training

== Service profile ==
The service spectrum of IISR spreads over three areas:

=== Research ===
The Institute provides research facilities related to spice crops, both Institute funded and externally funded. The objectives of the research programs span over:

- Collection, conservation, evaluation and cataloging of germplasm.
- Development of varieties of high yield, quality and resistance to biotic and abiotic stresses through conventional and biotechnological approaches.
- Standardising propagation methods to ensure large scale production and distribution of high yielding genotypes
- Development of agrotechniques for increasing production and productivity.
- Integrated pest and disease management.
- Post harvest technology
- Socio-economic aspects of cultivation, marketing and information dissemination in spices.
- Investigation on nutraceuticals and pharmacokinetics aspects of spices.

=== Education Corner ===
IISR provides facilities for research and project based education at Masters and PhD levels.

PhD Programme: Indian Institute of Spices Research is affiliated to Mangalore University, University of Kerala, Kerala Agricultural University, Acharya Nagarjuna University and Kannur University and offers doctoral research programs in various subjects:

- Biochemistry
- Bioinformatics
- Biotechnology
- Botany
- Entomology
- Genetics & Plant Breeding
- Geo-informatics
- Horticulture
- Microbiology
- Hematology
- Organic Chemistry
- Plant Pathology
- Plant Physiology
- Soil Chemistry

MSc/MTech Project: IISR offers a platform for project work for the students of MSc/MTech.

MPhil Thesis Work: MPhil programme students can undertake the thesis work under any of the scientists of the institute.

Post MSc/MTech Training: MSc/MTech holders can join for Post MSc/MTech Training under any of the scientists of the institute.

=== Farmers' Corner ===
IISR has, from time to time, organized projects for the development of spices farming. The All India Coordinated Research Project on Spices (AICRPS) is one such project. Further, IISR has prepared a knowledge base for the farmers, consisting of :

- Package of Practices: cultivation practices recommended for different spices available as pdf and html versions.
- Pamphlets in Malayalam
- Planting Materials: Availability, cost of different planting materials.
- Spice Varieties: Information on major spice varieties released from the institute.
- Success Stories: Proven technologies of the institute.

== Crops profile ==
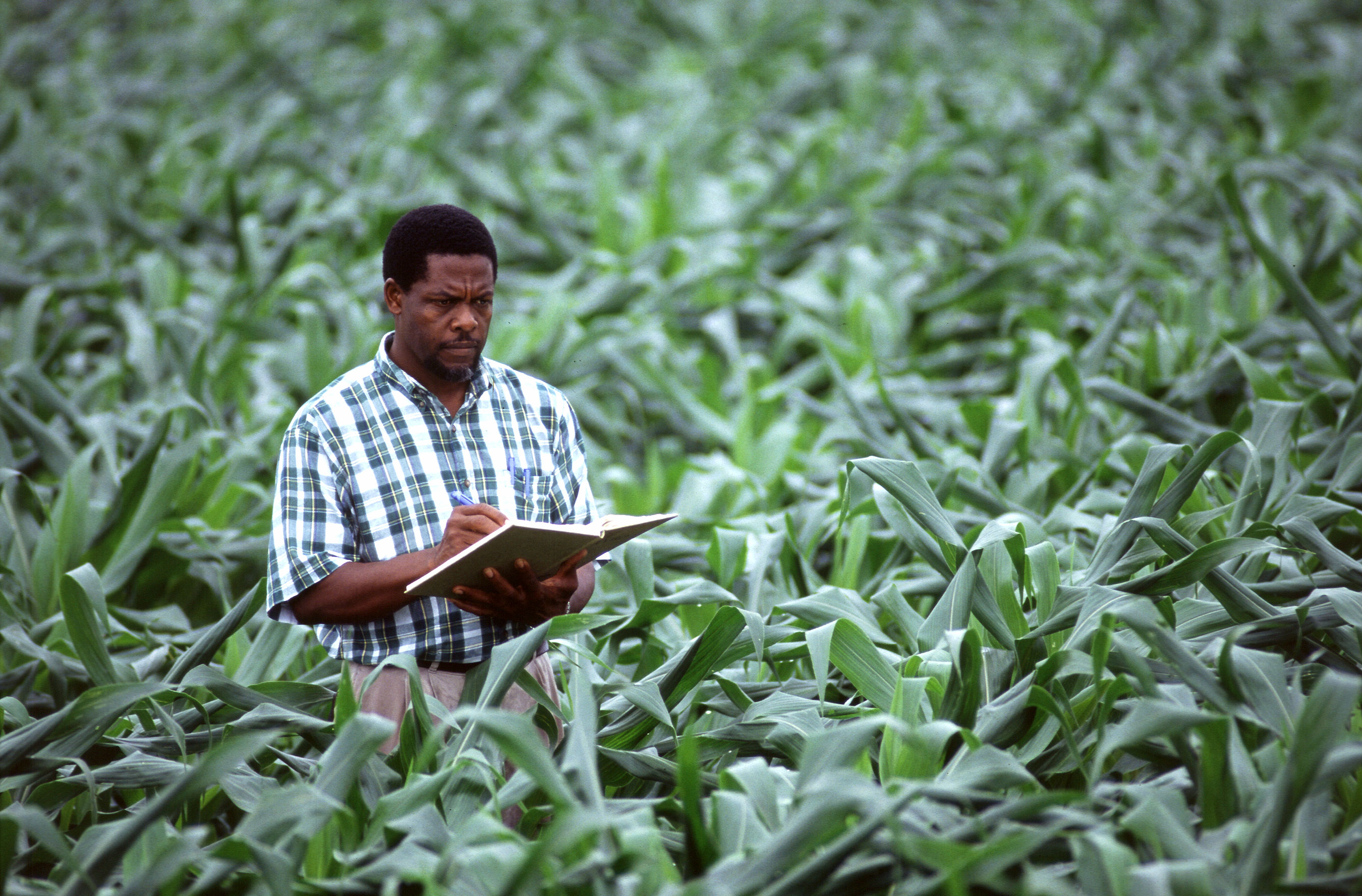

Ten crops have been brought under the mandate of the Indian Institute of Spices Research.

1. Garcinia (Garcinia gummi-gutta)
2. Black pepper (Piper nigrum)
3. Ginger (Zingiber officinale)
4. Clove (Syzygium aromaticum)
5. Cardamom (Elettaria cardamomum)
6. Nutmeg (Myristica fragrans)
7. Turmeric (Curcuma longa)
8. Cinnamon (Cinnamomum verum)
9. Paprika (Capsicum annuum)
10. Vanilla (Vanilla planifolia)

== Facilities ==
=== Laboratories and equipment ===
IISR has a range of full-fledged laboratories:

Centralized Molecular Biology facility: A centralized laboratory with Equipments such as PCR systems, electrophoresis units, gel documentation systems, particle delivery system, transilluminators, Protein Profile Probe, Cryo- preservation unit etc.

Centralized Biochemistry laboratory: For the quality evaluation, studies on nutraceuticals, plant physiology and biochemical studies equipped with HPLC, gas chromatograph, HPTLC, refractometer, moisture analyzer, Cylotec sample mill, freeze drier, vacuum concentrator, chlorophyll flurometer, plant canopy analyzer, Photosynthetic system, plant growth chamber etc.

Centralized Soil Chemistry lab: A state of art of Soil Chemistry for soil and nutrient profile studies. Atomic absorption spectrophotometer, nitrogen analyzer, ion meter etc. are available here.

Centralized Plant Protection lab: An advanced Plant Protection lab with different types of microscopes with image analyzing systems, thermal cyclers, deep freezers, ultra centrifuges, Elisa reader with washer & printer, incubated shakers, walk- in- cold room etc.

GCMS facility: For finger printing of aroma compounds in spices with all the latest libraries.

Biocontrol laboratory: A modern biocontrol laboratory for mass multiplication of biocontrol agents and natural enemies with fermentors, shakers etc.

=== Library and information ===
IISR has an extensive facility called the National Informatics Centre on Spices (NICS) which maintains global scientific literature, e-journals, offline and online databases, Internet connectivity and data storage facility. The library is automated with LIBSYS software. They also maintain a web portal, SpicE- Library and has an institutional repository named ‘D-Spice’ has been developed using the Open Software D- Space. The library has a collection of 4311 books, 3451 bound volumes, 2305 reprints, 906 technical reports 127 theses and 153 project reports. Currently the library is subscribing to 36 foreign journals including 14 online journals and 84 Indian Journals. It has access to online databases such as CeRA, CAB Abstracts and Academic Online.

=== DUS Testing Facility ===
IISR, in coordination with PPV&FR Authority, New Delhi, has set up a DUS testing laboratory which facilitates testing crop varieties for distinctiveness, uniqueness and stability (DUS).

=== Tissue Culture Accreditation Facility ===
Another service provided by IISR is the certification of tissue cultured spices plants. IISR has a laboratory for this purpose where spices are tested for virus infection and genetic fidelity under this facility.

The other facilities include a Bioinformatics Centre for seamless integration of life sciences and information science, a Geographic Information System (GIS) centre for GIS information, remote sensing and 3D modelling, a fully air conditioned Conference Hall which can accommodate 120 people and a Guest House.

== Agricultural Technology Information Centre (ATIC) ==
The ATIC is an IISR associate, serving as a single window for technology dissemination. The major activities of ATIC are:

- Distribution of quality planting material
- Production and distribution of printed literature
- Farm advisory services including crop diagnostic services
- Information dissemination through multimedia, video and interactive databases
- Providing audio visual aid support to the institute activities
- Organizing technology dissemination services like exhibitions, seminars to farmers and other users.

== Krishi Vigyan Kendra (KVK) ==
Krishi Vigyan Kendra was established in 1992 at Peruvannamuzhi village in Kozhikode as a subsidiary of the IISR. The principal objective was effective transfer of technology to the farming community. KVK is based at the IISR experimental farm in the village. The service spectrum of KVK includes:

- Farm Advisory Services
- Production and supply of Trichoderma
- Supply of improved breeds of chicks
- Plant and Animal Health Centre

== Awards and recognitions ==
IISR was awarded the Outstanding ICAR Institution Awards in 1999, 2009 and 2021, and received the ICAR Best Annual Report Award for the year 1996–97. Further, many scientists of IISR have been recognized at various levels.

== Publications ==
IISR has published many books for the farmers on the various aspects of spices farming and maintenance.

Sl. No.	Title	Year of Publication
1	Spice Varieties	1991
2	Diseases of Black Pepper	1991
3	Biological control in Spices	1996
4	Protocols for Micro propagation of Spices and Aromatic crops	1996
5	Bio diversity conservation and utilisation of Spices Medicinal and Aromatic Plants	1999
6	Varieties of Spices	2001
7	Bush Pepper, White Pepper, Rapid Multiplication of Black Pepper, Storage of Seed Ginger Rhizomes	2001
8	The Saga of Spices Research	2001
9	Spices Indica	2001
10	Problems and Prospects in Spices Production and Export	2002
11	Major Spices Production and Processing	2010
12	Package of Practices:Black Pepper, Ginger, Turmeric, Clove, Nutmeg, Cinnamon and Vanilla	2005
13	Zingiberaceous Spices -Technologies for sustainable production	2008
14	Plant Pathogens and Their Biocontrol Agents - Diagnostics and characterization	2008
14	Major Spices Production and Processing	2010

In addition, many papers prepared at IISR is in circulation as pamphlets and web content.

== See also ==
- Van Vigyan Kendra (VVK) Forest Science Centres
