= Mewa Singh =

Mewa Singh may refer to:

- Mewa Singh (professor) (born 1951), Indian primatologist, ethologist, and conservation biologist
- Mewa Singh (politician), Indian politician in Haryana
- Mewa Singh Lopoke (1881–1915), or Mewa Singh, Indian Sikh activist in Canada
