= Disease management =

Disease management may refer to:

- Disease management (agriculture)
- Disease management (health)
