= Peruvannamuzhi Dam =

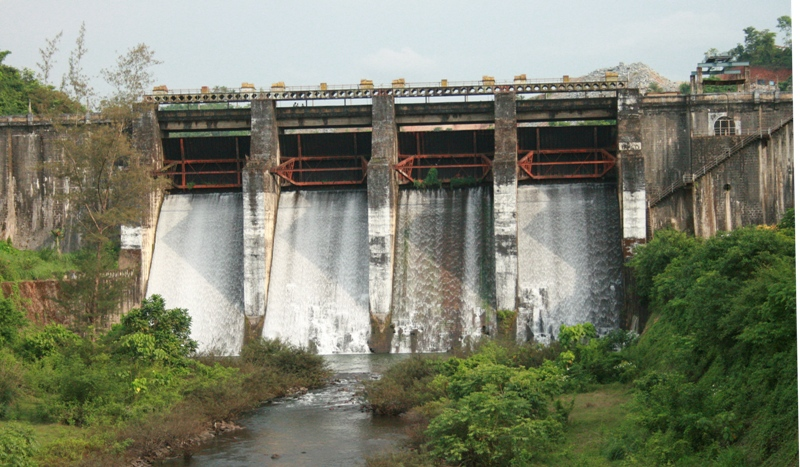
- View of Peruvannamuzhi Dam
- Interactive map of Peruvannamuzhi Dam
- Official name: Kuttiyadi Dam
- Coordinates: 11°35′47.1″N 75°49′25″E
- Opening date: 1973

Upper dam and spillways
- Length: 170.69 m (560.0 ft)

Lower dam and spillways
- Spillway capacity: 120.52 M m^{3}

Peruvannamuzhi dam, also known as Kuttiady (Id) Dam, is a dam built on the Kuttiady River at Peruvannamuzhi in Chakkittapara Grama Panchayath in Kozhikode district, Kerala. It is 16 km away from Kuttiady town and it is 55 km from Kozhikode town. It was constructed as part of the Kuttiady irrigation project. The project consists of a masonry dam across Kuttiyady River and 13 earth dams to maximize the storage of the reservoir. The construction of this project started in 1962 and was commissioned in 1973.

The reservoir of this dam is located in Chakittapara and Koorachundu panchayats. There are speed boat and tower boat facilities. It is a popular tourist attraction of Kozhikode district. The Peruvannamuzhi Wildlife Sanctuary is also known as Malabar Wildlife Sanctuary.

== Power generation ==
In the future, Kerala State Electricity Board plans to generate a small amount of power using 6 MW turbines. Annual production is expected to be 24.7 MU.

== Features of the project ==
- Project name: Kuttiyadi (Peruvannamoozhi) Dam Irrigation project
- Location: Near Kozhikode City
- Latitude: 11 o 35'47.76" North
- Longitude: 75 o 49'24.6" East
- Purpose: Irrigation and water supply.
- Date of commencement: 1962
- Date of completion: 6 February 1973
- Project Identification Code (PIC): KL 07 MH 0026

Project Benefits

- Irrigation benefits
- Gross Command Area: 36000 Ha
- Cultivable command area: 14569 Ha
- Annual irrigation potential: 10568 Ha
- Water Supply Benefits
- Annual Water supply: 71.54 MCM
- Flood Protection area: 8000 Ha
- Area Benefitted: 24000 Ha

Details of the Dam

- Dam type: Masonry Dam
- Total Length: 170.60 metres (559.7 ft)
- Top width: 6.71 metres (22.0 ft)
- Elevation of top: + 46 .85 m above MSL
- Height of the dam: 35.36 metres (116.0 ft)
- Saddle Dams: 13 numbers - Homogenous rolled earth

Saddle Dams

- Saddle Dam 1 Type: 13Nos. - Homogenous rolled earth
- Total Length of the Saddle dam 1,844 metres (6,050 ft)
- Top width of Saddle Dam(m): 4.00 metres (13.12 ft)
- Elevation of top of Saddle Dam (m): +46.85 MSL
- Height of Saddle Dam:20.535 metres (67.37 ft)

Main Spillway

- Type of Spillway: Ogee
- Length of spillway: 48.80 metres (160.1 ft)
- Location of spillway: Chainage 63 meters to 119.30 meters
- Spillway crest level: +38.44 meters
- Number of bays: 4
- Type of Spillway gates: Radial
- Width of spillway gate: 12.20 metres (40.0 ft)
- Height of spillway gate: 07.62 metres (25.0 ft)

Reservoir

- Catchment area: 108.78 square kilometers
- Maximum water level: +44.61 meters
- Full Reservoir level: +44.41 meters
- Dead Storage level: 25.52 metres (83.7 ft)

== Gallery ==
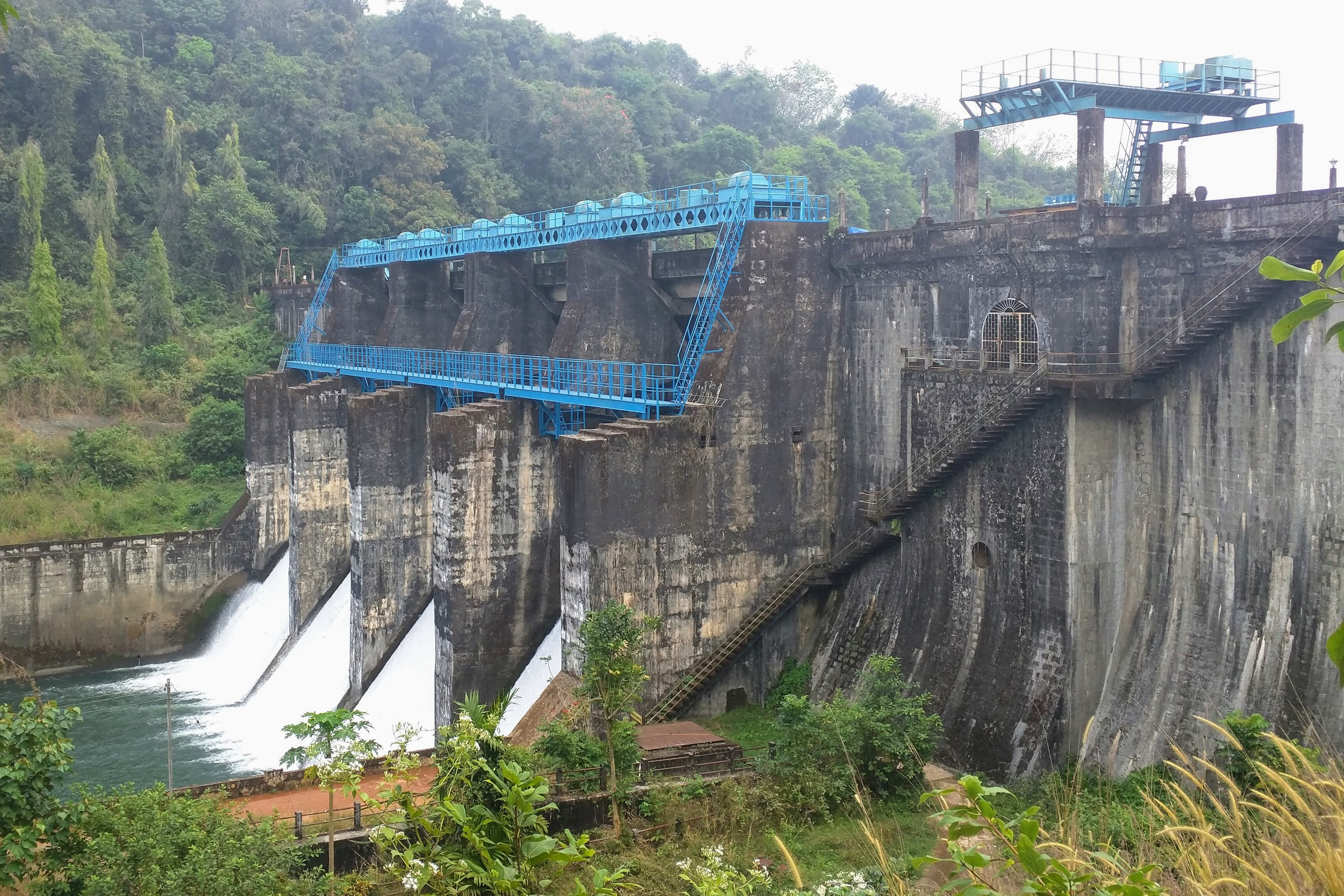
