= Malabar Wildlife Sanctuary =

Wildlife sanctuary in Kerala, India

- മലബാർ വന്യജീവി സങ്കേതം
- IUCN category IV (habitat/species management area)
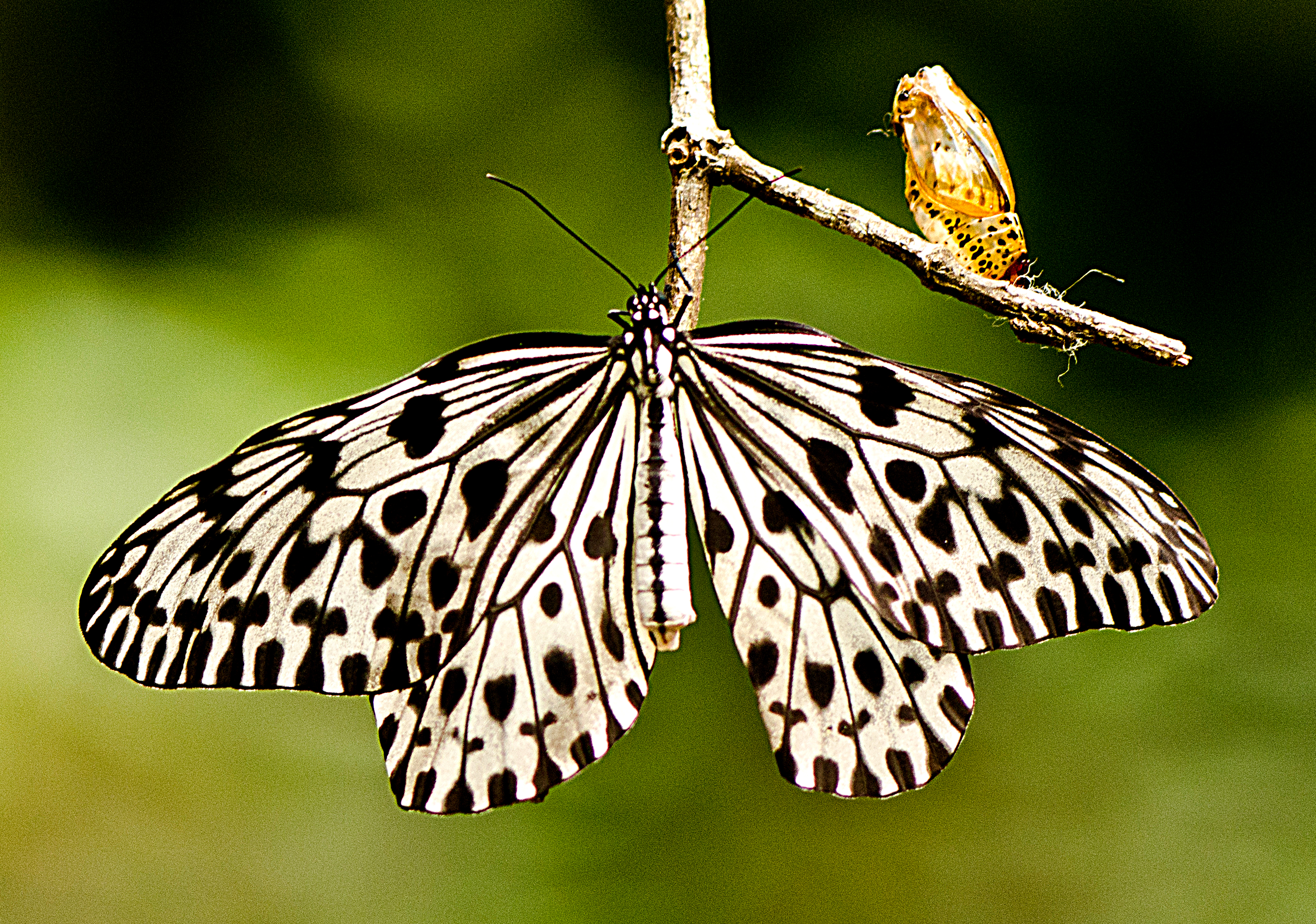
- Idea malabarica in the Sanctuary

- Location within Kerala Location within India
- Interactive map of Malabar Wildlife Sanctuary
- Location: Kozhikode District, Kerala, India
- Nearest city: Kozhikode
- Coordinates: 11.4446°N 75.6935°E
- Area: 74.215015 square kilometres (28.654577 sq mi)
- Established: 2010
- Governing body: Department of Forests and Wildlife, Kerala

Malabar Wildlife Sanctuary is a protected area located along the Western Ghats and spread across 74 square kilometres (29 mi^{2}) in Chakkittapara and Koorachundu revenue villages of Koyilandy Taluk in Kozhikode, Kerala. The sanctuary is part of the western ghats, a biodiversity hotspot. It also comes under the Nilgiri Biosphere Reserve and forms a part of the Wayanad Elephant Reserve.
