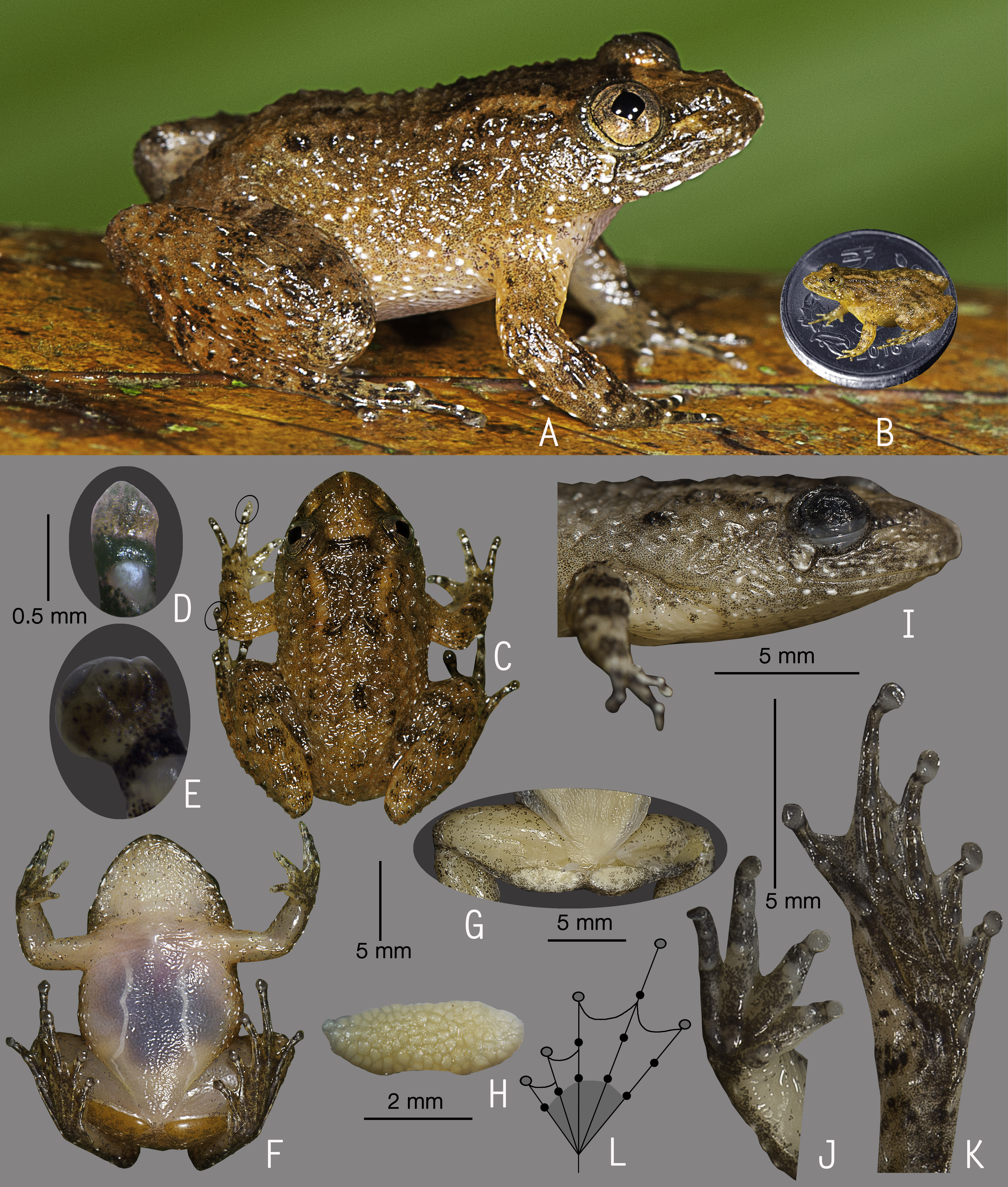

Scientific classification
- Kingdom: Animalia
- Phylum: Chordata
- Class: Amphibia
- Order: Anura
- Family: Nyctibatrachidae
- Genus: Nyctibatrachus
- Species: N. athirappillyensis

Binomial name
- Nyctibatrachus athirappillyensis Garg et al., 2017

= Nyctibatrachus athirappillyensis =

Species of amphibian

Nyctibatrachus athirappillyensis is a frog in the genus Nyctibatrachus. It was described in 2017 based on specimens collected in Thavalakuzhipara, Vazhachal forest and is named after the nearby Athirappilly waterfalls.

== Distribution ==
The species was discovered from areas adjoining the Athirappilly waterfall, Kerala, at site for a proposed hydroelectric project. They are found in shallow streams inside forest. Calling males were found at the edge of streams under vegetation.
