= Koorachundu =

Koorachundu Koorachund, Athiyodi
- village
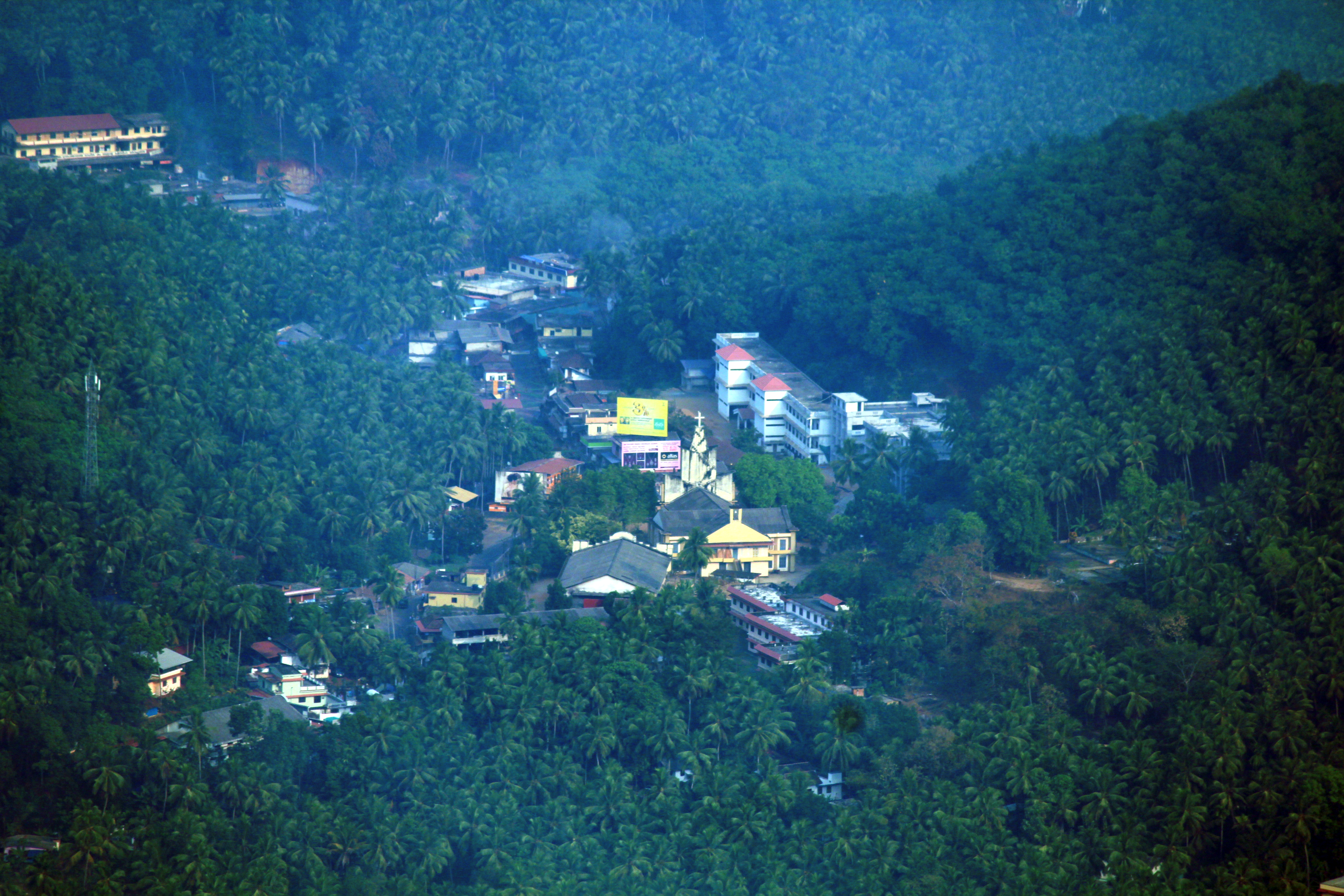
- Nickname: കോഴിക്കോടിന്റെ ചിറാപൂഞ്ചി
- Location in Kerala, India Koorachundu (India)
- Coordinates: 11°32′17″N 75°50′44″E
- Country: India
- State: Kerala
- District: Kozhikode

Languages
  - Official: Malayalam, English
- Time zone: UTC+5:30 (IST)
- PIN: 673527
- Telephone code: 0496
- Vehicle registration: KL-77
- Nearest city: Kozhikode
- Lok Sabha constituency: Kozhikode
- Climate: Tropical monsoon (Köppen)
- Avg. summer temperature: 35 °C (95 °F)
- Avg. winter temperature: 20 °C (68 °F)
- Website: www.koorachundu.com

Koorachundu is a village towards the north east of Kozhikode district of Kerala in India.

== Location ==
Koorachundu is about 39 km from Kozhikkode city and lies in between the tourist spot Peruvannamuzhi and the hydro electric power generator station at Kakkayam in the Western Ghats.

== Tourism ==
The Pervannamuzhi - Kakkayam reservoir area in the Koorachundu village is a local tourist spot. Koorachundu town, with about a couple hundred shops, is the commercial center in the region:local handicraft items and spices are the trademark of the town. Koorachund is known to the outside world for its struggle against the products of multinational corporations and its effort to conscientize people about consuming local products and manufacturing products utilizing locally grown items. The Peruvannamuzhi irrigation reservoir stretches the length of Koorachund nourishing it with the abundant water resource and fish. Several tourist spots can be found throughout the reservoir area.
Boat services are available at Peruvannamoozhi, a few kilometers away from Koorachund town.
The kakkayam damsite, teeming with wildlife, offers trekking and rock climbing opportunities for tourists.

== Climate ==
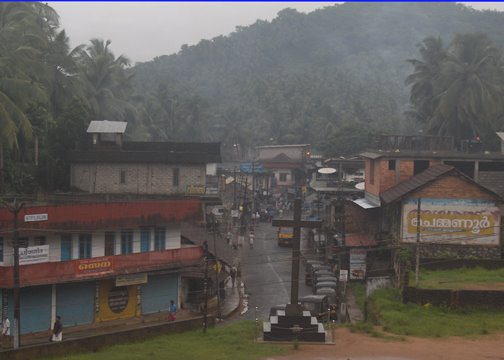
Koorachundu Town

Koorachund has a generally humid tropical climate with a moderately hot season extending from March to May. The average annual rainfall is more than 3500 mm. this is the highest rain fall region in Calicut district.

== Demographics ==
Christians constitute majority of the population, followed by Muslim and Hindu communities respectively. The majority of the inhabitants are successors of, migrants from the Southern districts of Kerala(Mid-Travancore). The primary language spoken here is Malayalam, with English also being widely understood.

== Educational institutions ==
The village is home to two Higher Secondary Schools -St Mary's Higher Secondary school (Kallanode), and St Thomas Higher Secondary School, Koorachundu . Apart from these government aided schools, there is one private English medium school [National Public School] in Koorachundu town. There is another private English medium school, Blossom English medium school, near Muhyudheen juma masjid, Athiyodi.

== Koorachund Festival ==
The Annual Feast of St. Thomas church Koorachund is considered as the Festival of Koorachundu. Apart from special masses and other activities for the catholic members, it also organizes a variety of activities for the general populace of Koorachundu. The Feast usually begins on 26 December and ends on the 30th of the same month. Giant Wheels and Circus troupes, usually add flavor to the carnival. Pradakshinam (procession/circumambulation), is one of the major attractions of the Feast along with fire works and other cultural activities. And the Milad Shareef which conducted by Muhyudheen mahallah committee is another festival of koorachund. Generally it conducted three days around rabeeul avval 12 (hijri).

== Swedeshi movement ==
Koorachund village is known for the pioneer swadeshi movement after the independence. The farmers and traders of the locality took the pledge that they will ban all possible multi-national products to save the ever sinking local market. About the swadeshi movement of Koorachundu, K Krishnakumar of Frontline writes, "...this village, comprising largely families of farmers who migrated decades ago from central Kerala, is now a champion of the swadeshi cause. It is perhaps the first village in the country where a spontaneous movement has emerged for a total bo ycott of relatively cheap, imported palmolein (oil) and encouragement to the use of coconut oil as a cooking medium. Coke and Pepsi have long since disappeared from shop shelves here. Instead, customers who ask for a soft drink are invited to helpings of tender coconut water and impromptu lectures on the virtues of the natural drink."

== Arts and Sports Club ==
Koorachund is known for its passion for arts and sports. There are quite a few registered arts and sports clubs in the locality:Couple of the notable ones are KALA Koorachund, Wiils Koorachund, Victory Chalidam, Phoenix Poovathumchola and Winners Arts and Sports Club Poovathumchola. Drama, traditional dances, cinematic dances etc., are the major art forms being pursued by these clubs. Onam, the chief festival of Kerala which lasts for ten days, becomes the major occasion to show a club's talents in arts. Among sports, Koorachund is known for its annual Kabadi, Volleyball and Tug-of-war events. Winners Arts and Sports club poovathumchola is the major competitor in all of these sports events. January is the season of football game. Fr. Vattukulam Memorial ground Kallanode witness the sports spirit of the young people of Koorachundu who line under the banners of more than half a dozen local sports clubs and compete against one another and other major sports clubs of Kerala.

== Transportation ==
Koorachundu village connects to other parts of India through Vatakara town on the west and Kuttiady town on the east. National highway No.66 passes through Vatakara and the northern stretch connects to Mangalore, Goa and Mumbai. The southern stretch connects to Cochin and Trivandrum. The eastern National Highway No.54 going through Kuttiady connects to Mananthavady, Mysore and Bangalore. The nearest airports are at Kannur and Kozhikode. The nearest railway station is at Vatakara.
