= Mewa Singh (professor) =

Indian primatologist and ethologist

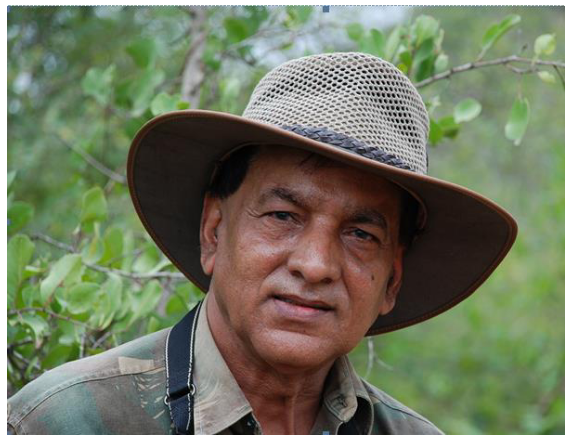
- Born: 11 April 1951 (age 75); Village Hathoa
- Occupation: Life-Long Distinguished Professor
- Known for: Primatologist, Ethologist and Conservation biologist

Mewa Singh (born 11 April 1951) is an Indian primatologist, ethologist, and conservation biologist. He was a professor of ecology and animal behavior at University of Mysore Biopsychology Department in Mysore, Karnataka. Currently he is a Life-Long Distinguished Professor in University of Mysore. Singh has a bachelor's degree in English, a Master's and a PhD degree in Psychology but was never formally trained in Biological or Conservation Sciences. Yet he is popular and revered for coordinating courses in Evolution, Genetics, Animal Behavior, Conservation Biology and Statistics not only in his department at the University of Mysore but at academic schools, conferences and faculty refresher courses throughout the country.

A new night frog Nyctibatrachus mewasinghi has been named after him which is endemic to the Western Ghats. It is generally referred to as Mewa Singh's Night frog.

Singh's research centers on primate social behavior, including conflict resolution, cooperation, inequity aversion,food-sharing, primate bereavement, etc. He is the author of the book Primate Societies and co-author of Macaque Societies: A Model for the Study of Social Organization. He has published more than 200 research articles on several animal species. Singh also studies the viability of primate populations and is frequently quoted in the media as an expert in this area.

He is a fellow of all three Science Academies of India: Indian Academy of Sciences Bangalore; Indian National Science Academy New Delhi; National Academy of Sciences Allahabad. He is also a Ramanna Fellow, DST, a Fellow of the National Academy of Psychology, India and a Distinguished SERB Fellow (2019).
