= Disease management (agriculture) =

Minimizing crop disease to improve yield

In agriculture, disease management is the practice of minimizing disease in crops to increase quantity or quality of harvest yield.

Organisms that cause infectious disease in crops include fungi, oomycetes, bacteria, viruses, viroids, virus-like organisms, phytoplasmas, protozoa, nematodes and parasitic plants. Crops can also suffer from ectoparasites including insects, mites, snails, slugs, and vertebrate animals, but these are not considered diseases.

Controlling diseases can be achieved by resistance genes, fungicides, nematicides, quarantine, etc. Disease management can be a large part of farm operating costs.

== See also ==
- Corn smut
- Great Irish Famine
- Blight
