= Peruvannamuzhi =

- village
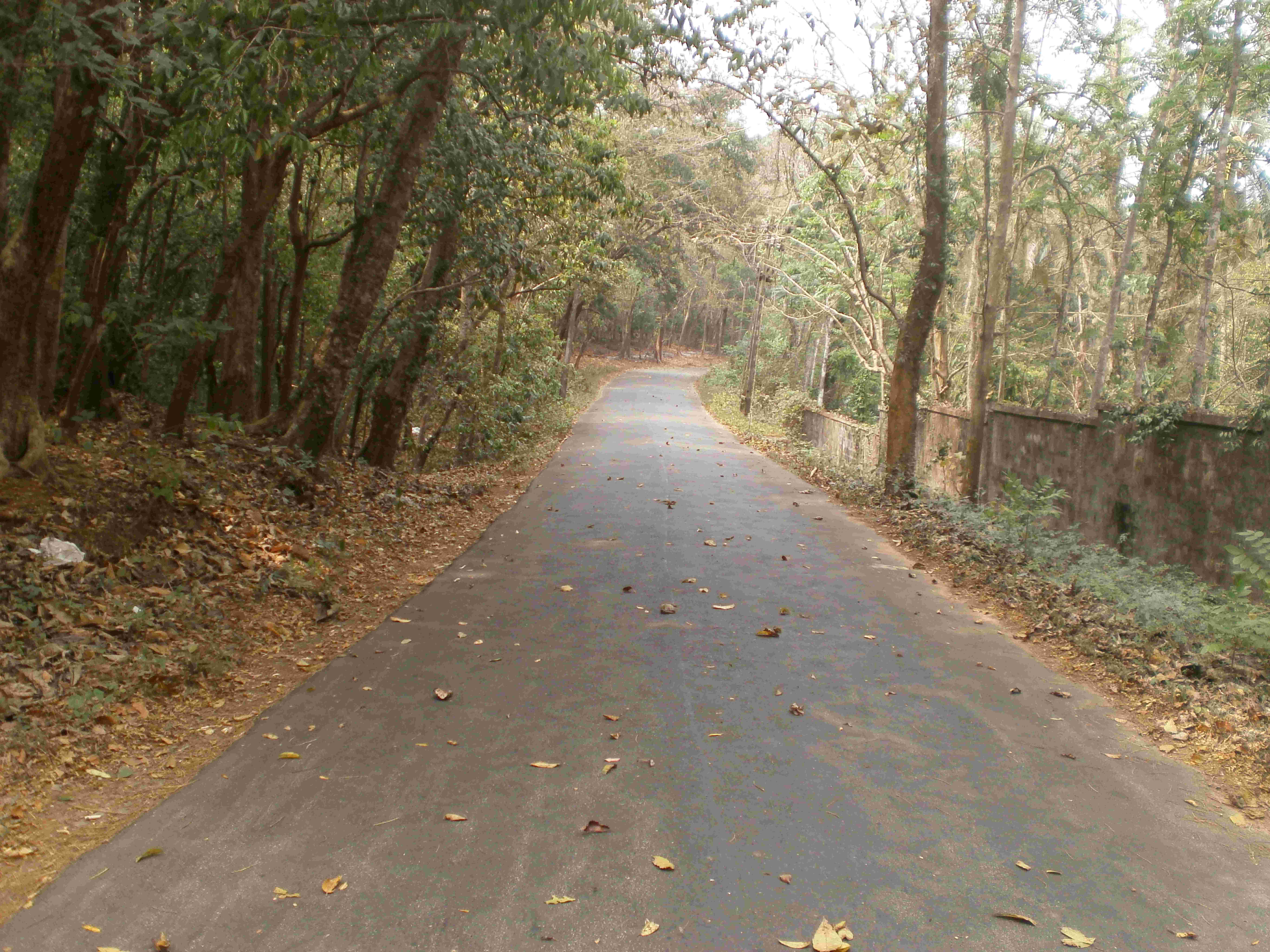
- Peruvannamuzhi Dam Road
- Interactive map of Peruvannamuzhi
- Coordinates: 11°35′0″N 75°49′0″E
- Country: India
- State: Kerala
- District: Kozhikode

Languages
  - Official: Malayalam, English
- Time zone: UTC+5:30 (IST)
- Vehicle registration: KL-77
- Coastline: 0 kilometres (0 mi)
- Nearest city: Kozhikode
- Climate: Tropical monsoon (Köppen)
- Avg. summer temperature: 35 °C (95 °F)
- Avg. winter temperature: 18 °C (64 °F)

Peruvannamuzhi or Peruvannamoozhy is a village in Chakkittapara Panchayath Kozhikode district, Kerala, India. Peruvannamuzhi forms part of the newly inaugurated Malabar Wildlife Sanctuary and is rich in flora and fauna.

== Tourism ==
Kuttiyadi Irrigation Project Dam is situated in Peruvannamuzhi. Peruvannamuzhi is known for tourism, wildlife and research on spice crops.

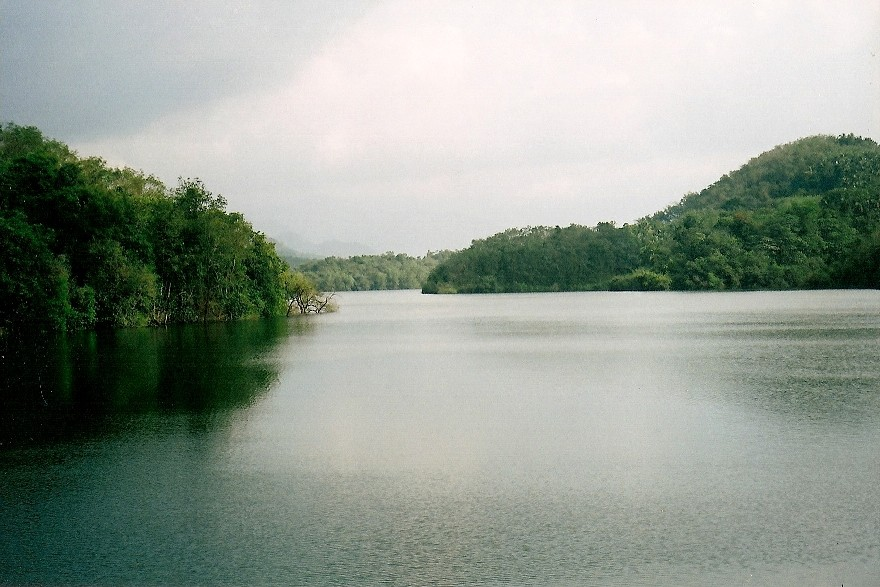
Peruvannamoozhi Dam and Surrounding areas

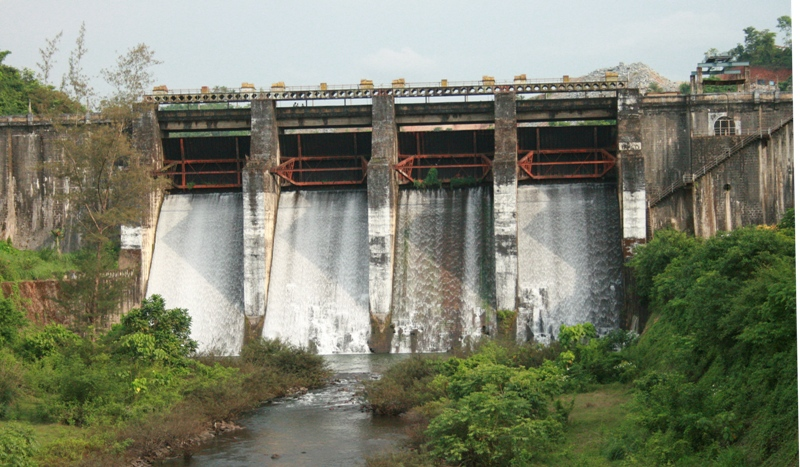
Peruvannamoozhi Dam

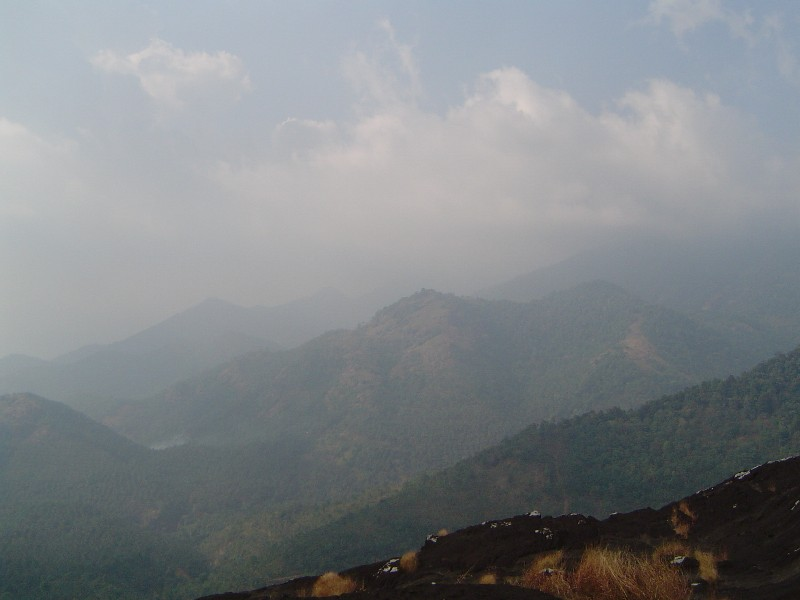
Pottiyapara

== Peruvannamuzhi Dam ==
Peruvannamoozhy, a village located 60 km from Kozhikode, Kerala, has been included in the list of eco-tourism destinations in Kerala with the Tourism Minister inaugurating the eco-tourism project here on 10 August 2008.

Located in the Western Ghats, the Peruvannamoozhy is home to over 680 species of rare plants. The facilities available here include wild animal rehabilitation centre, bird sanctuary, crocodile farm, snake park, spice garden, trekking and boating. The reservoir here provides facilities for speedboat and rowboat cruises. There are also uninhabited islands in the region.

== Access ==
The Peruvannamuzhi Dam is two hours from Kozhikode by road. The nearest railway station is Vatakara Railway Station and the nearest airport is Karipur International Airport.
