= List of amphibians of Kerala =

This is a list of amphibian species found in the Kerala, India.

== Order: Anura (frogs) ==
=== Family: Bufonidae (true toads) ===
==== Genus: Duttaphrynus ====
===== Duttaphrynus beddomii (Beddome's toad) =====
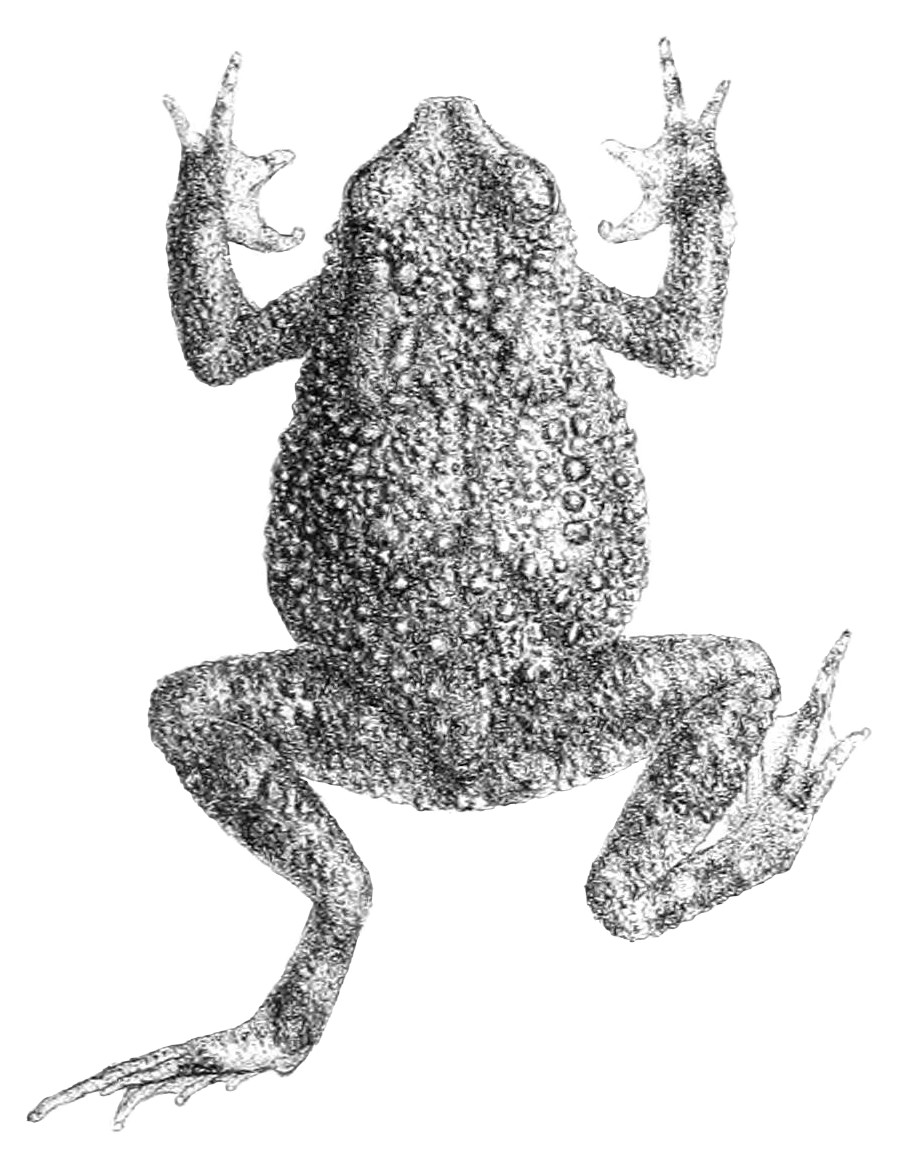
Dorsal view

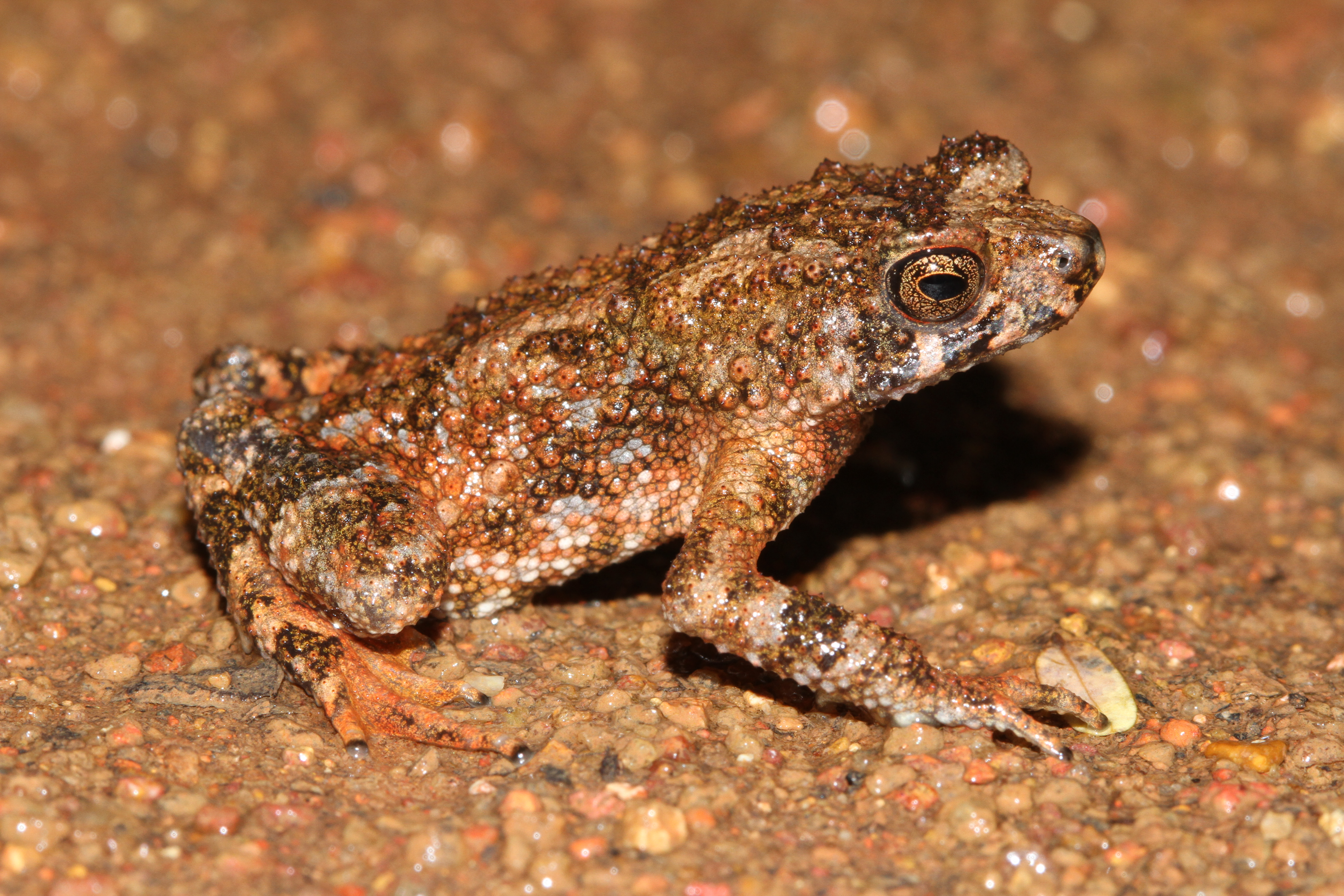
Lateral view

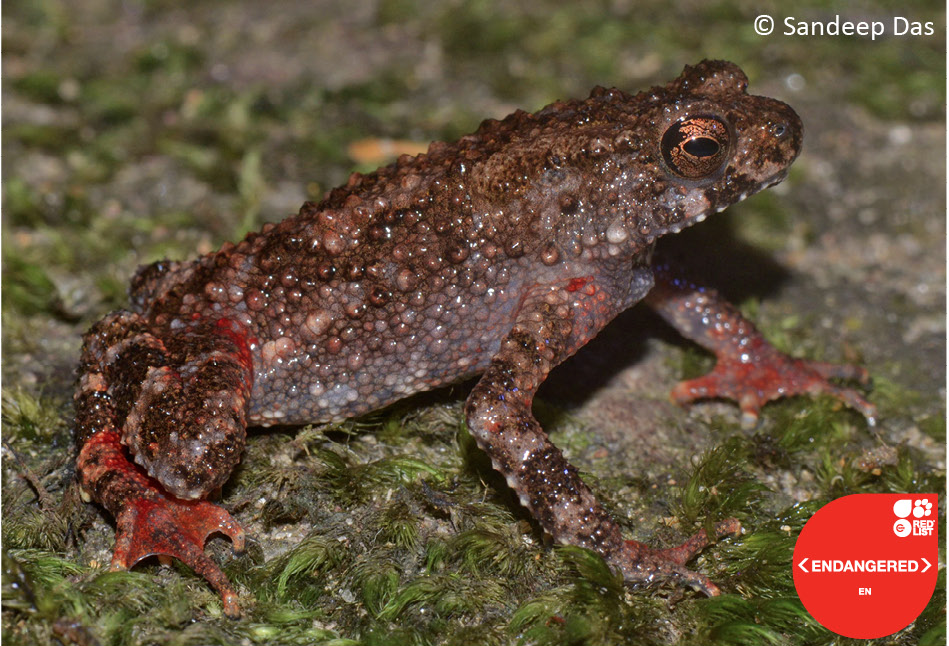
Lateral view

===== Duttaphrynus melanostictus (common Asian toad) =====
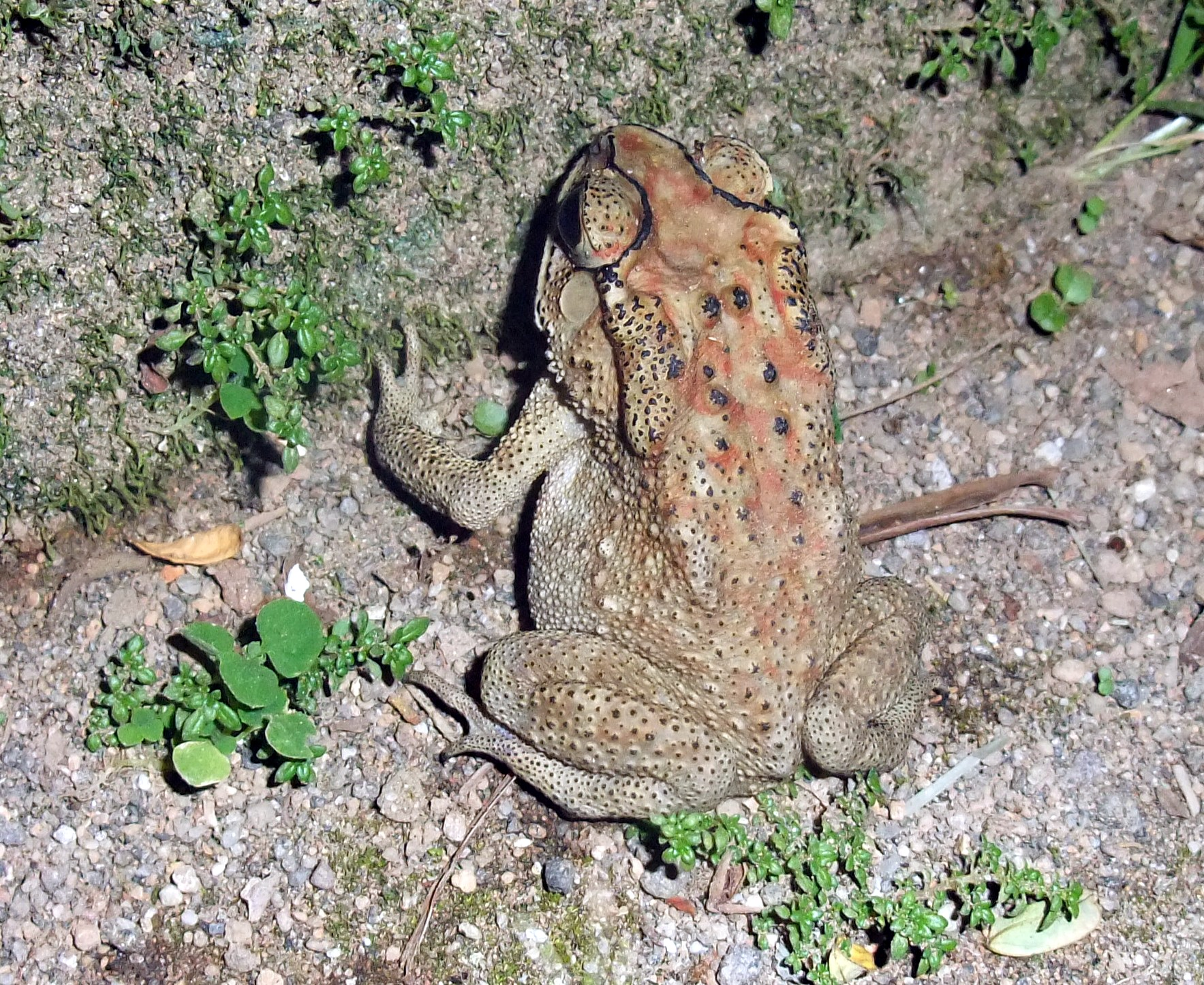
Dorsal view

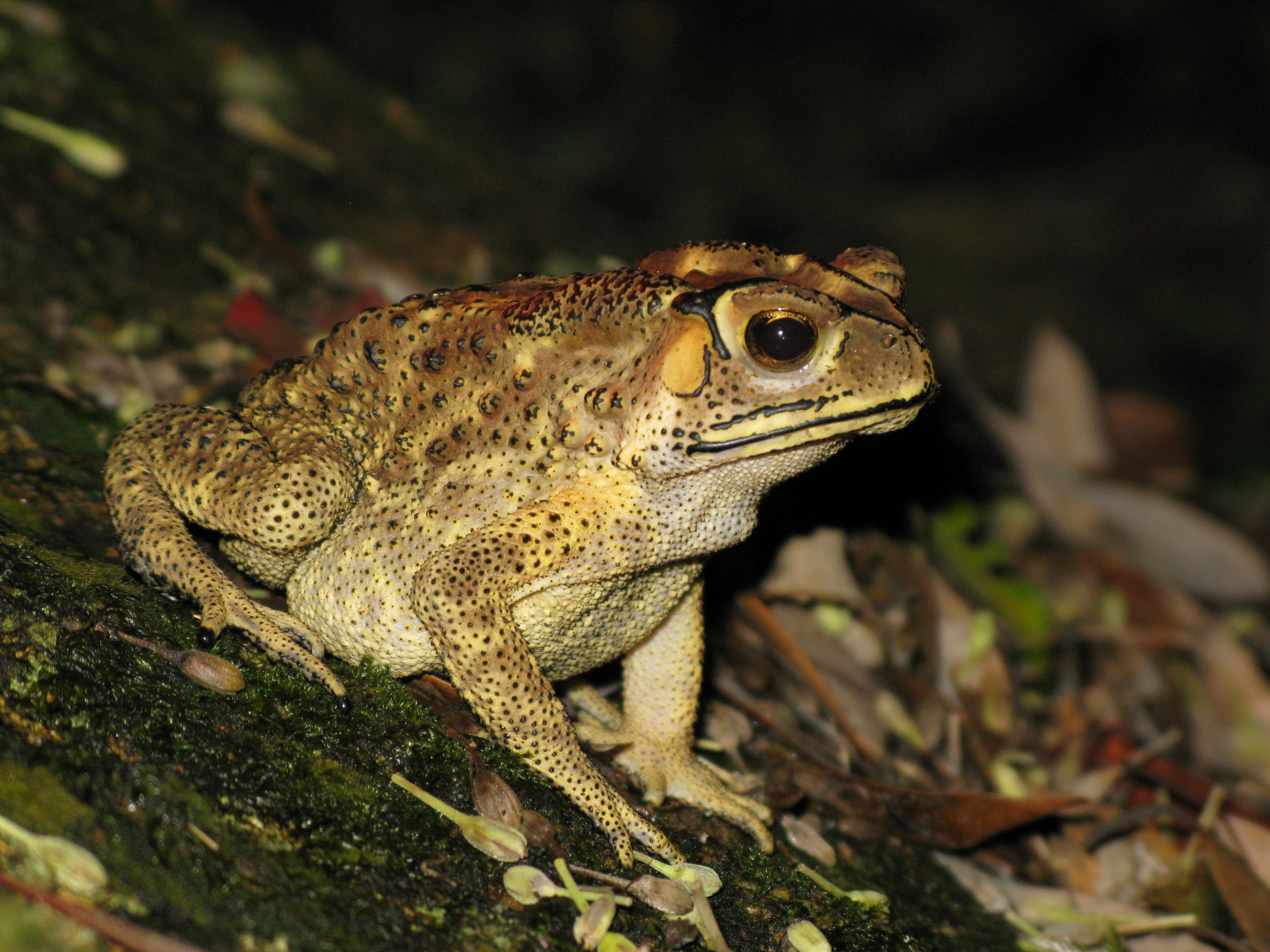
Lateral view

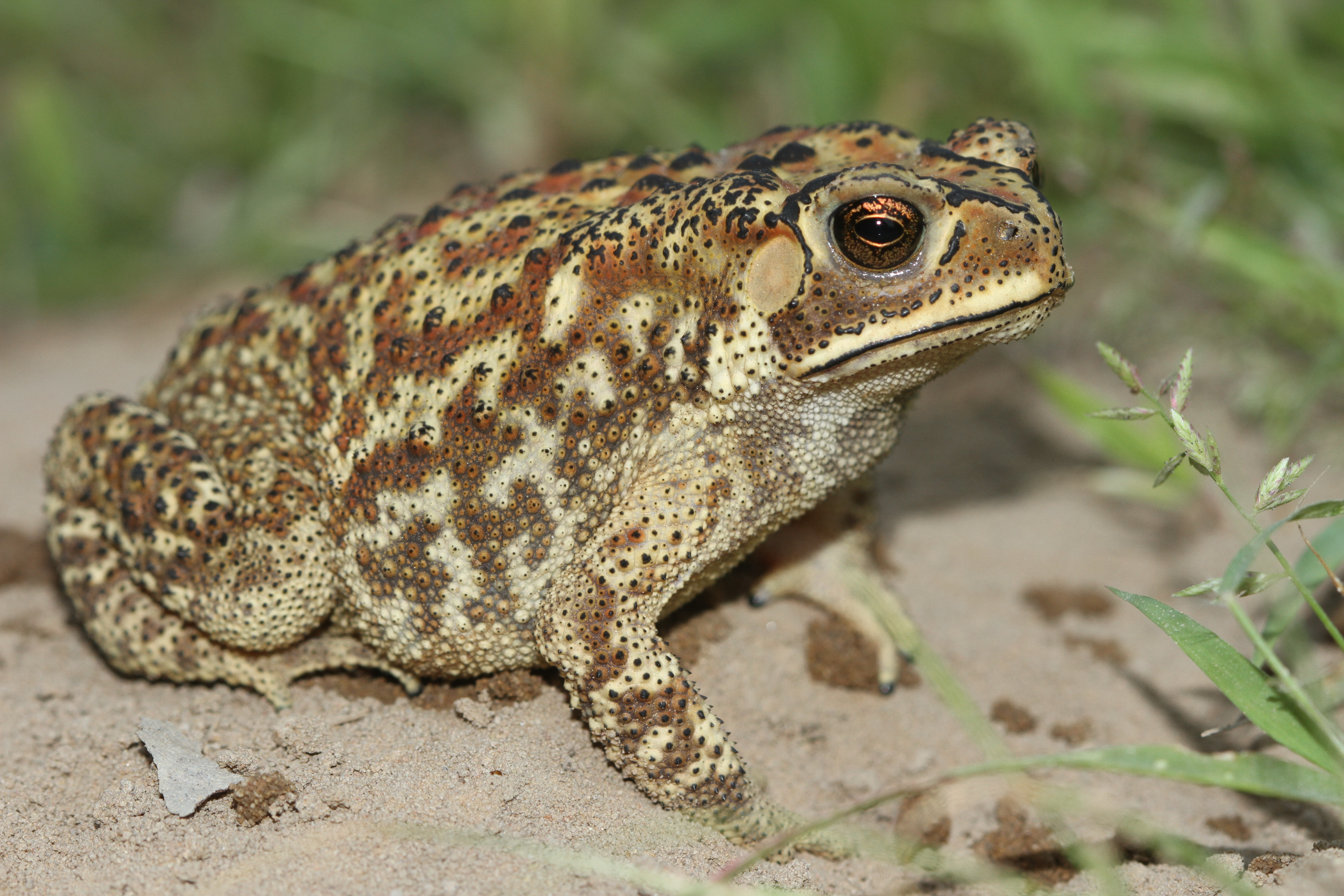
Lateral view

===== Duttaphrynus microtympanum (southern hill toad) =====
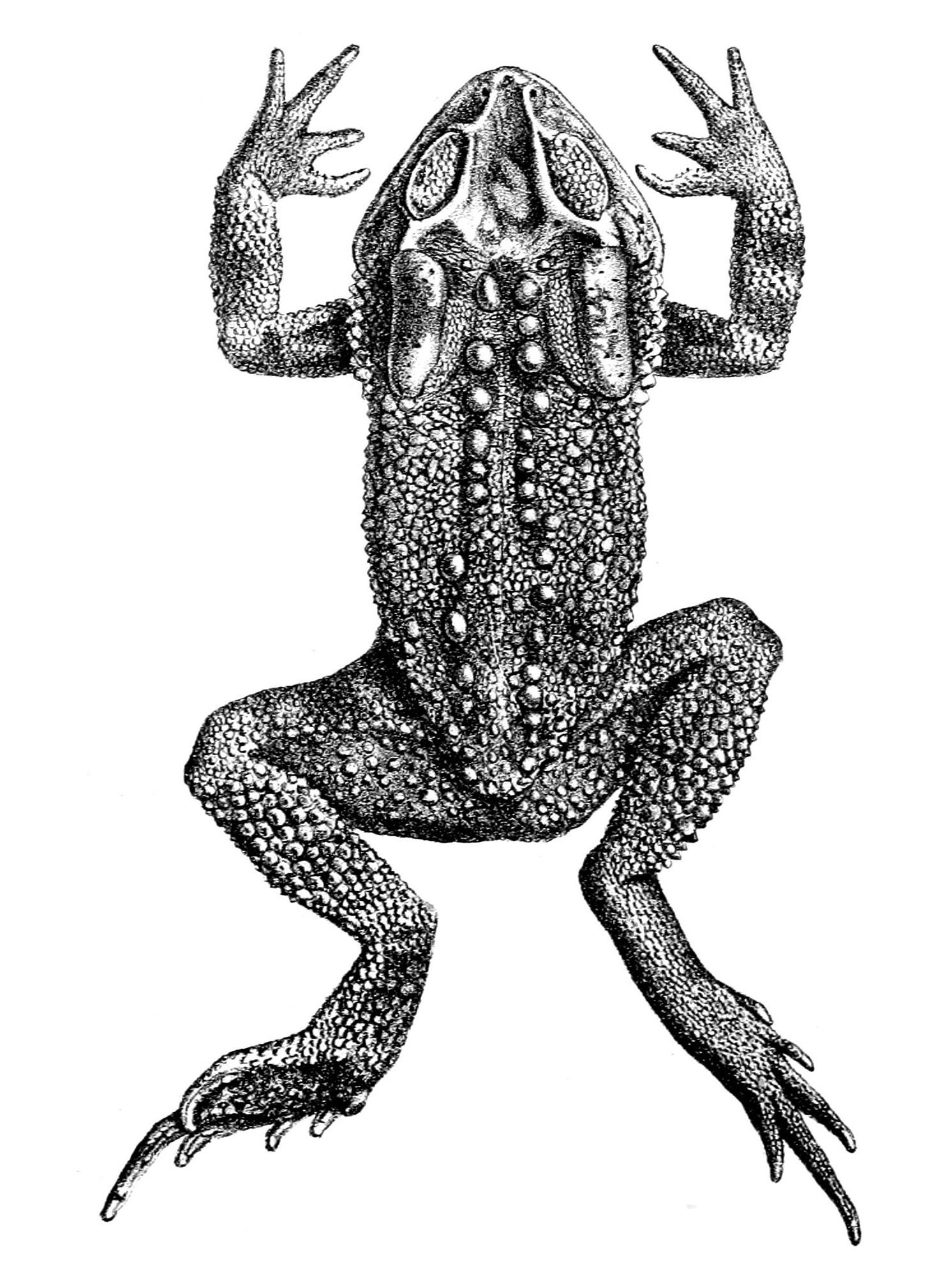
Dorsal view

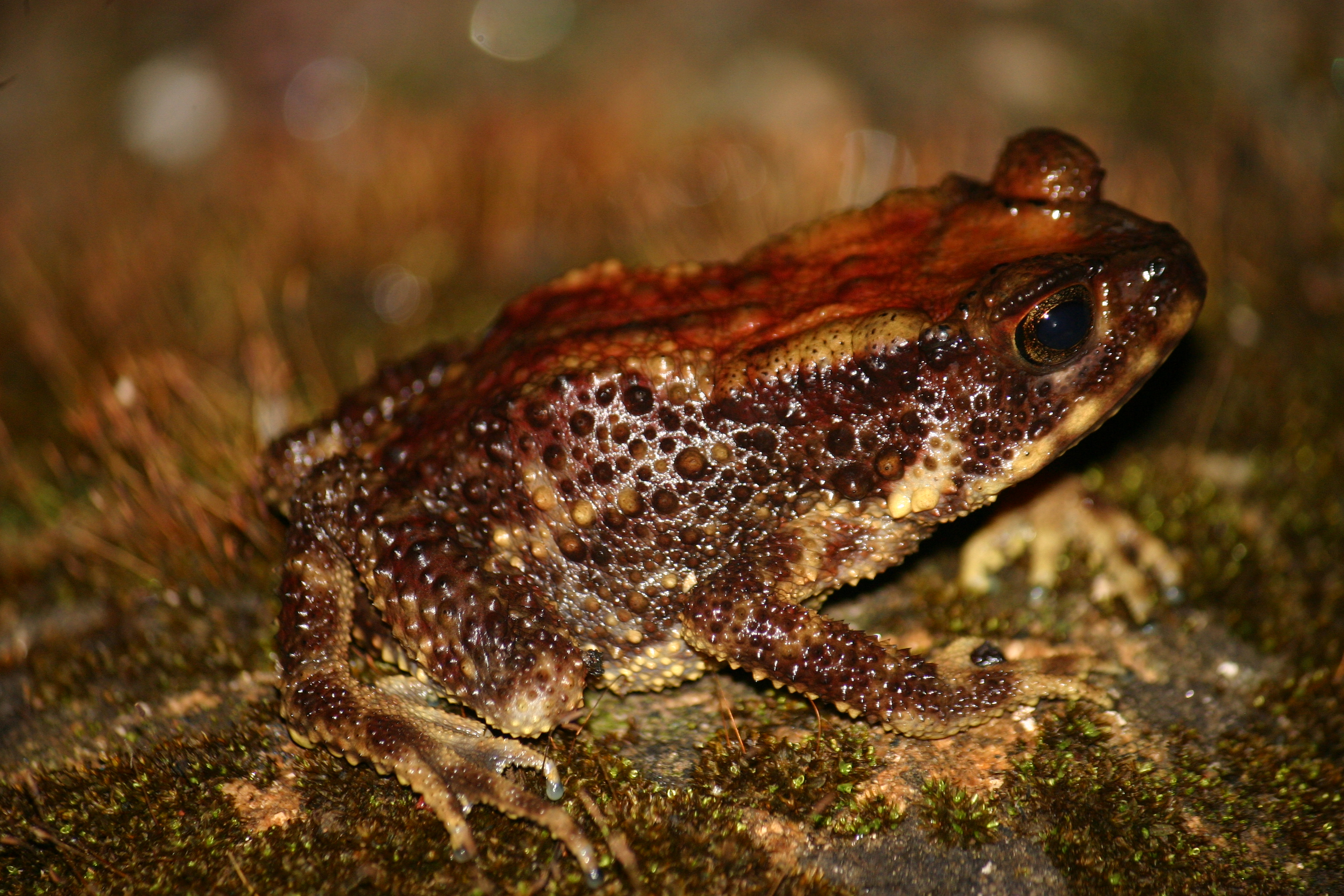
Lateral view

===== Duttaphrynus parietalis (Indian toad) =====
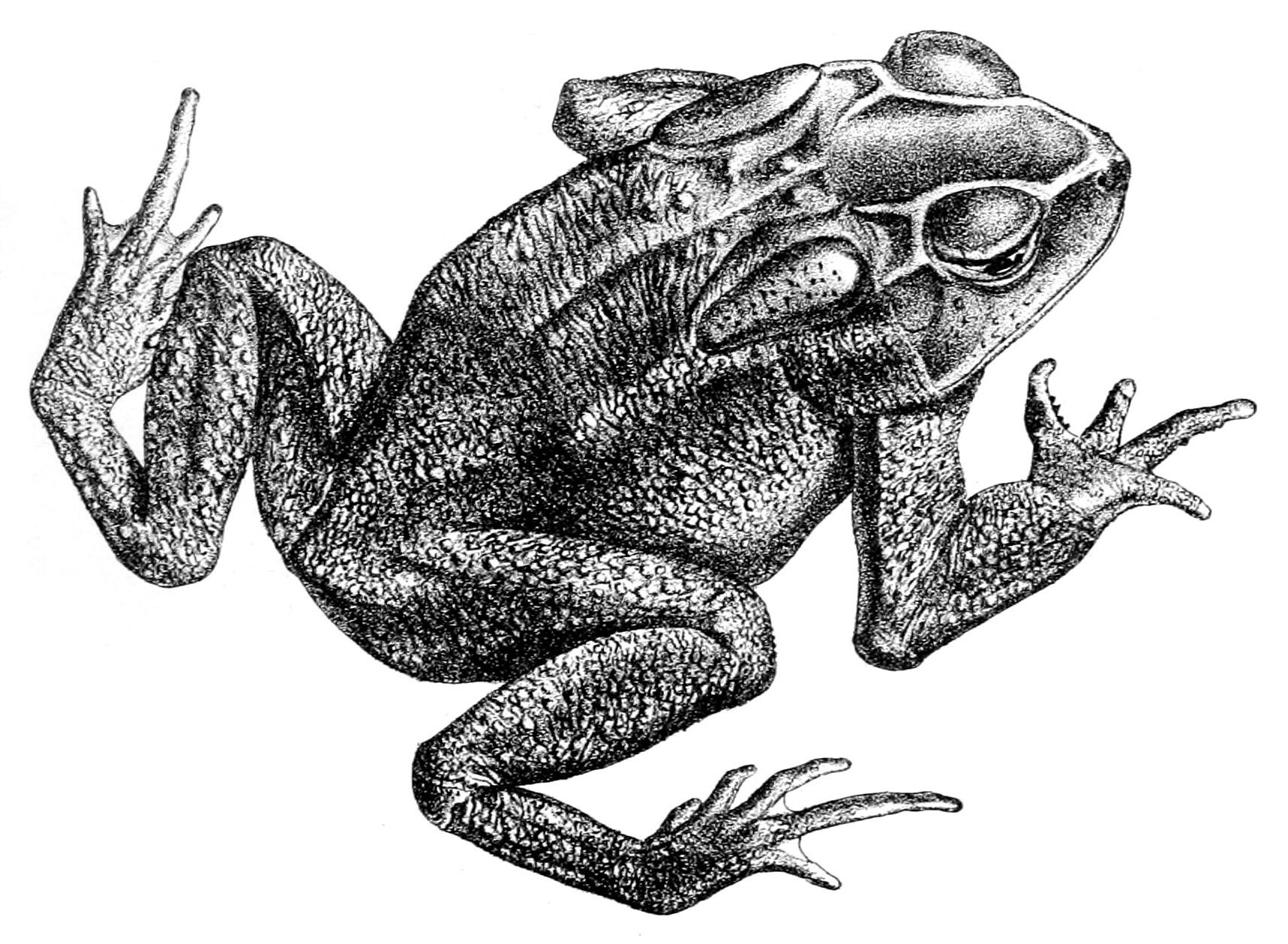
Dorsal view

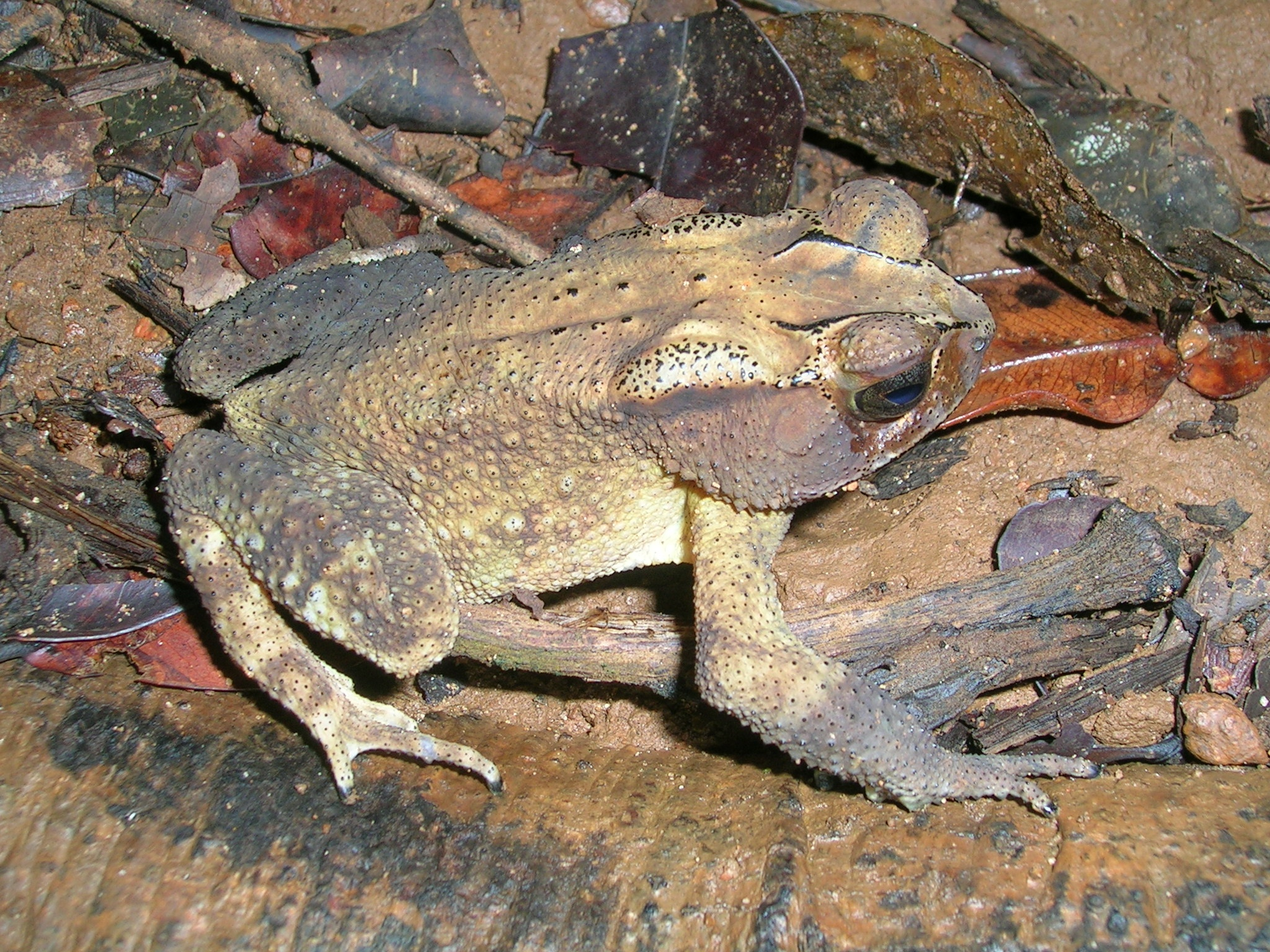
Lateral view

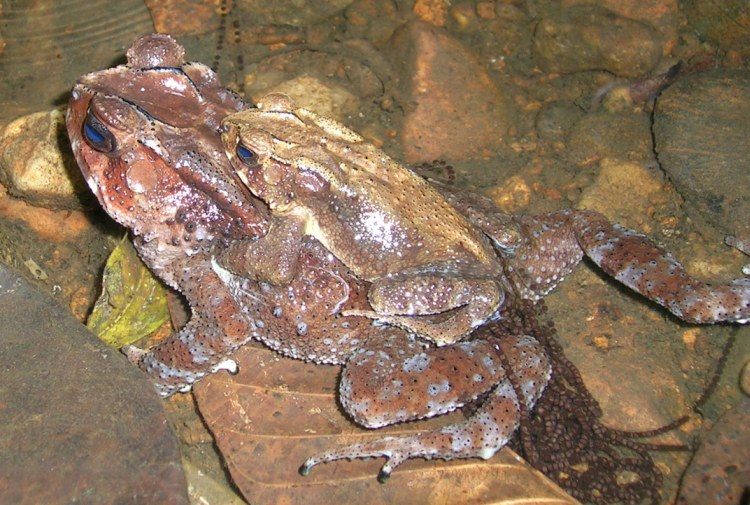
Mating

===== Duttaphrynus scaber (Ferguson's toad) =====
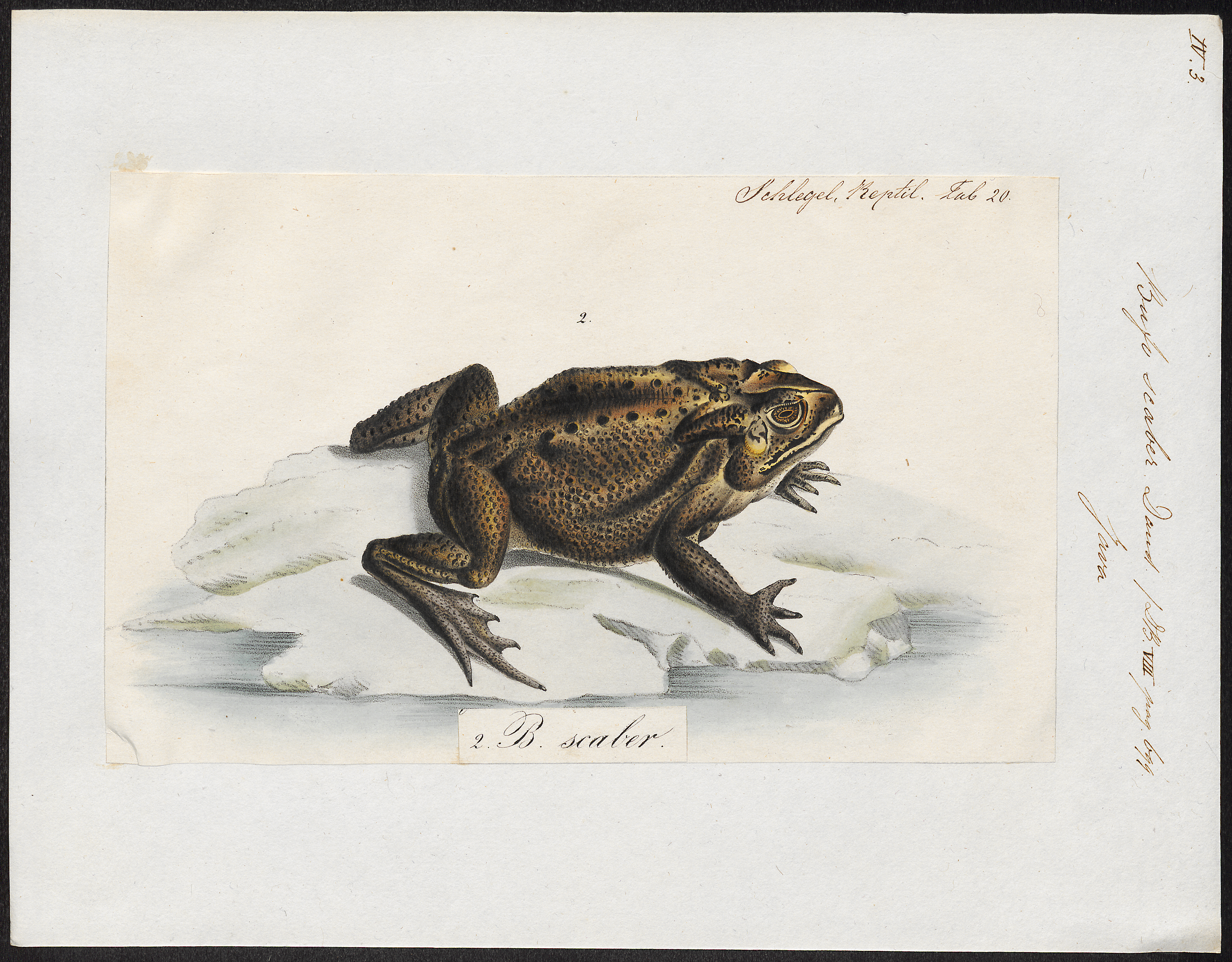
Dorsal view

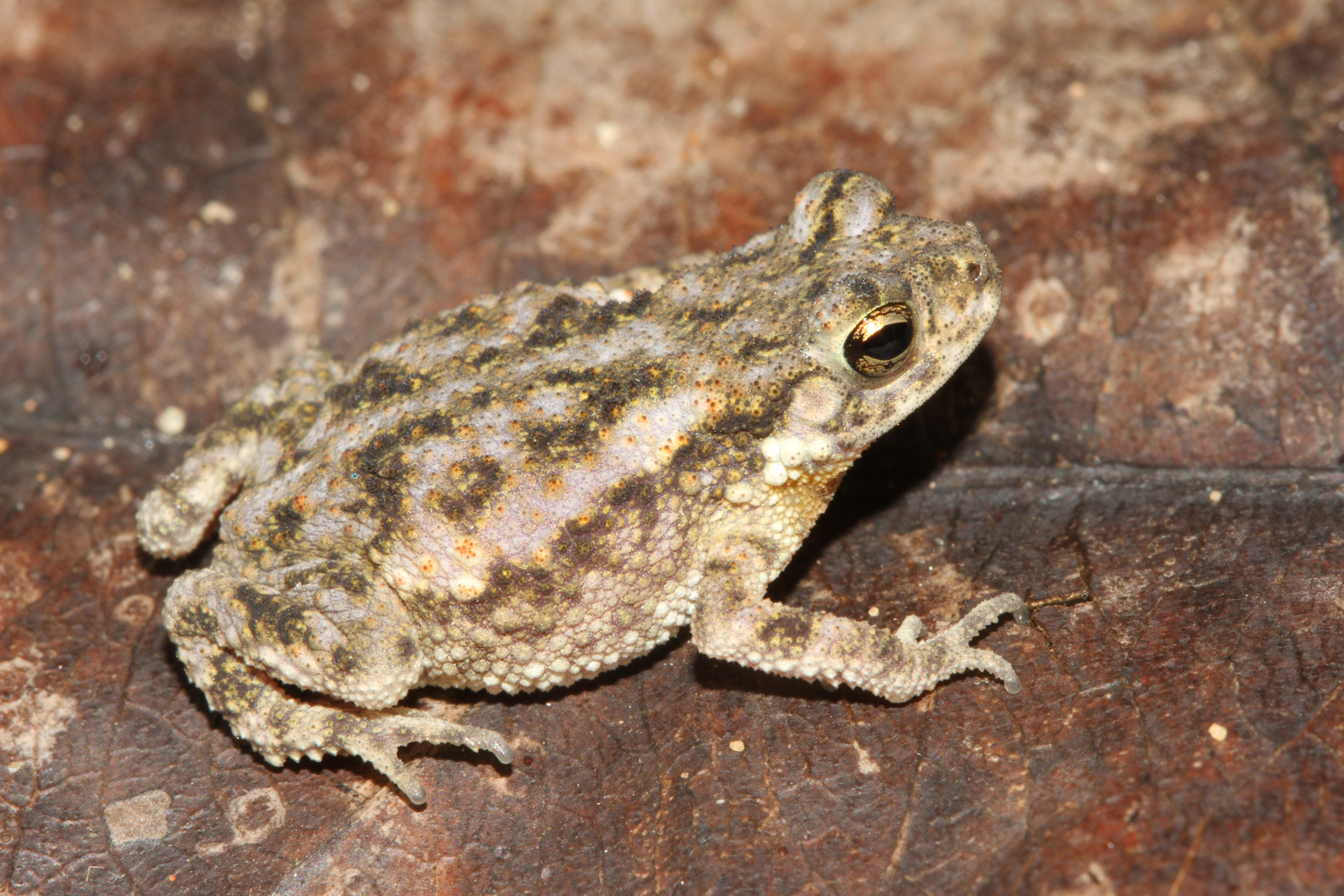
Lateral view

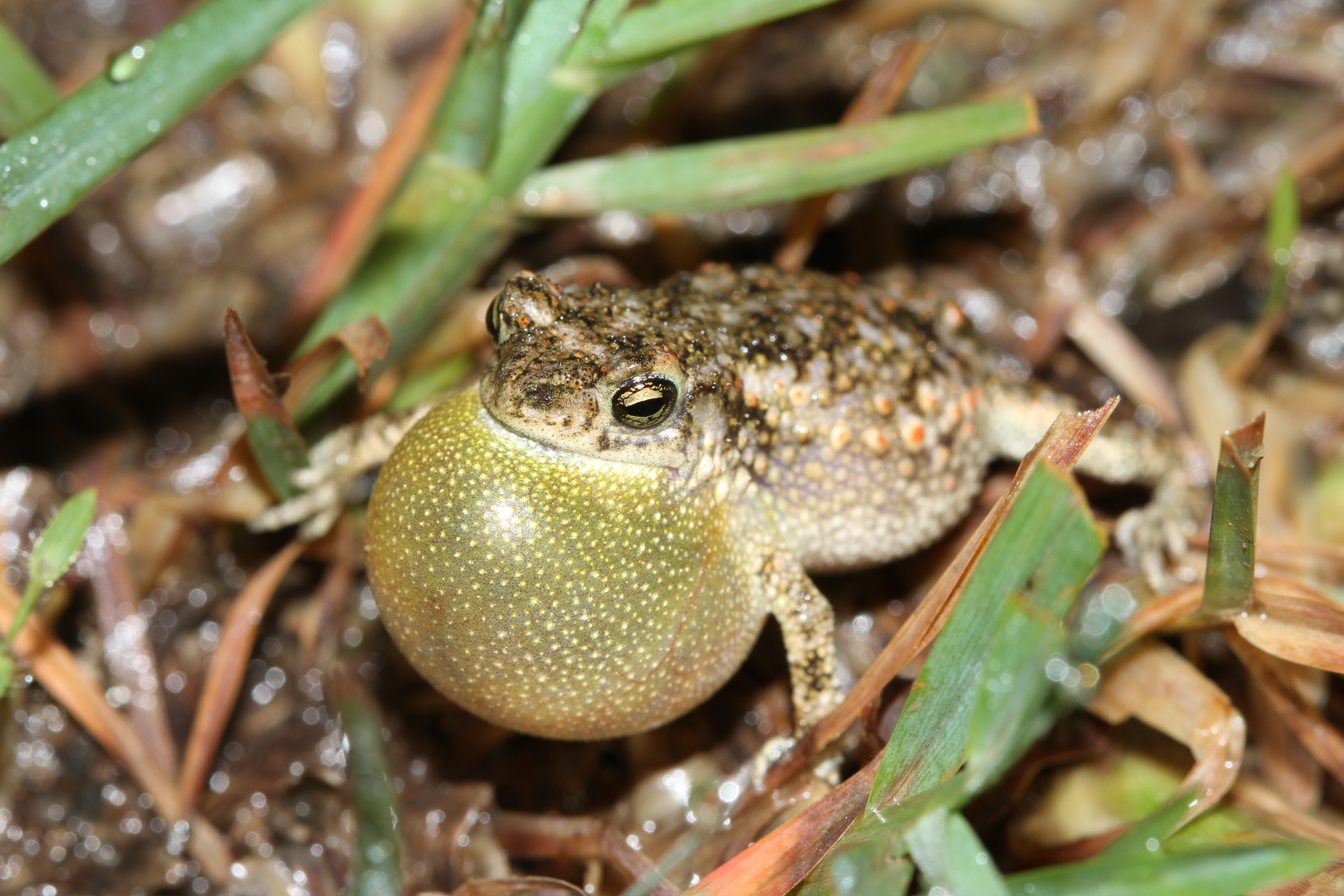
Calling

==== Genus: Ghatophryne ====
===== Ghatophryne ornata (Malabar torrent toad) =====
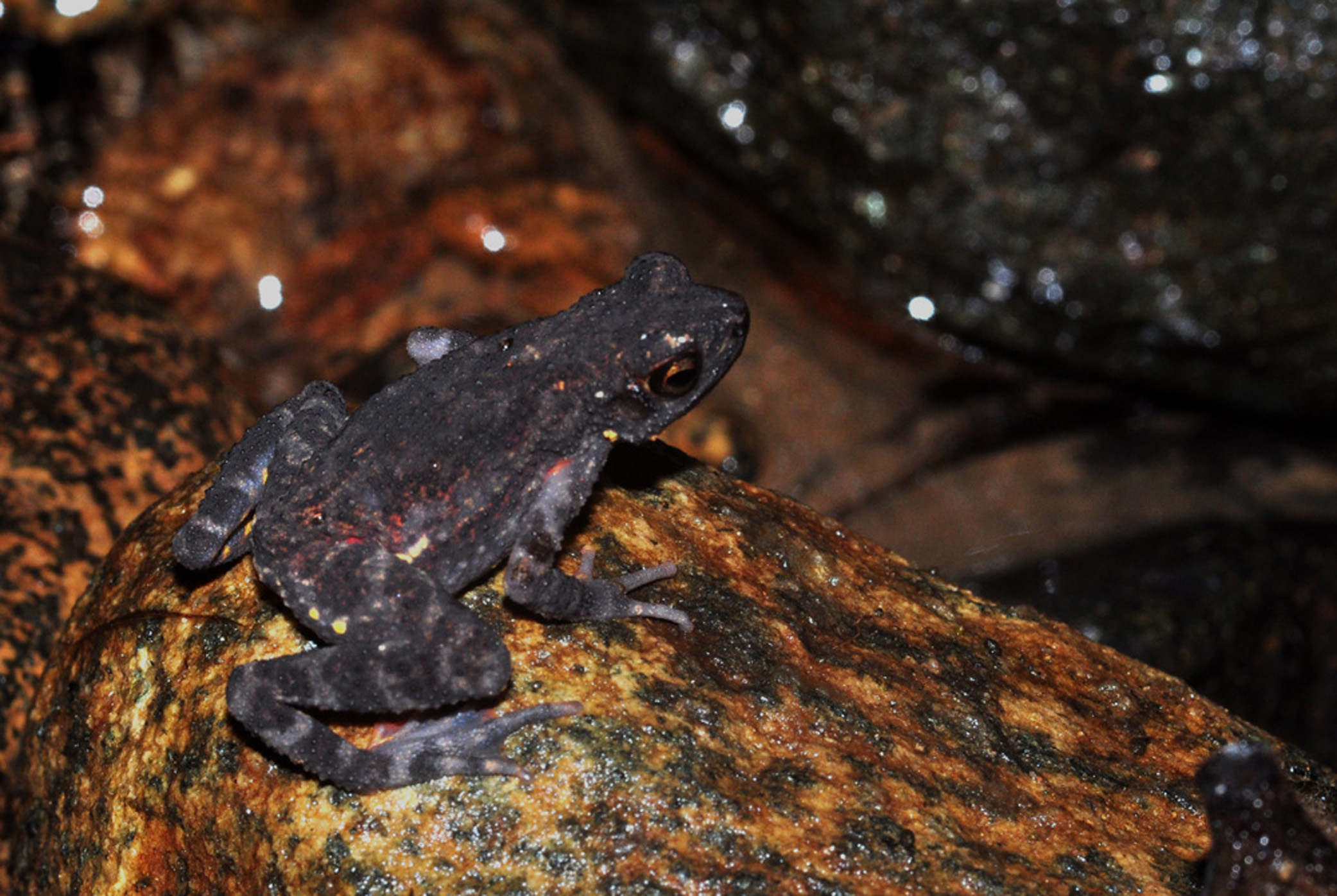
Dorsal view

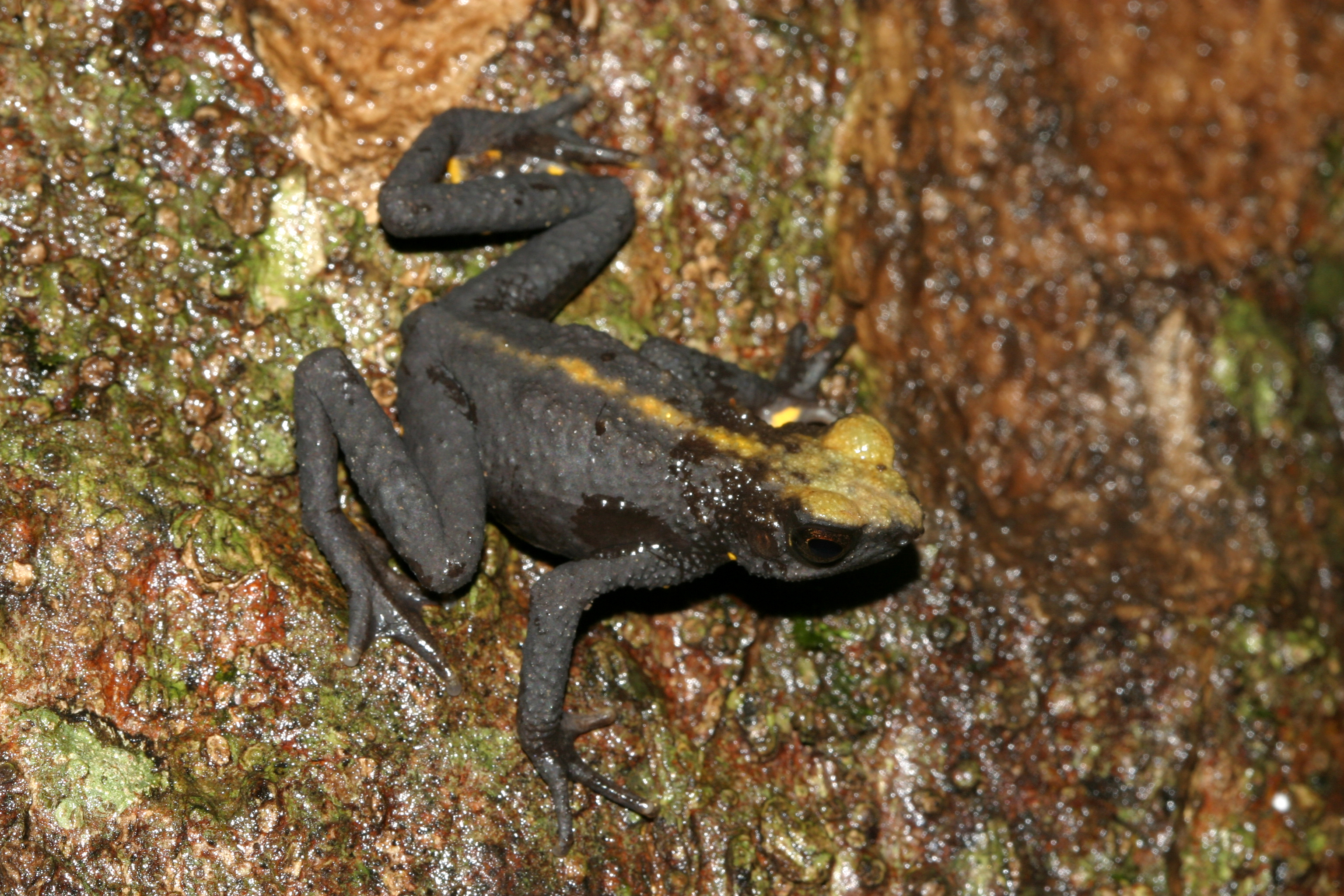
Dorsal view

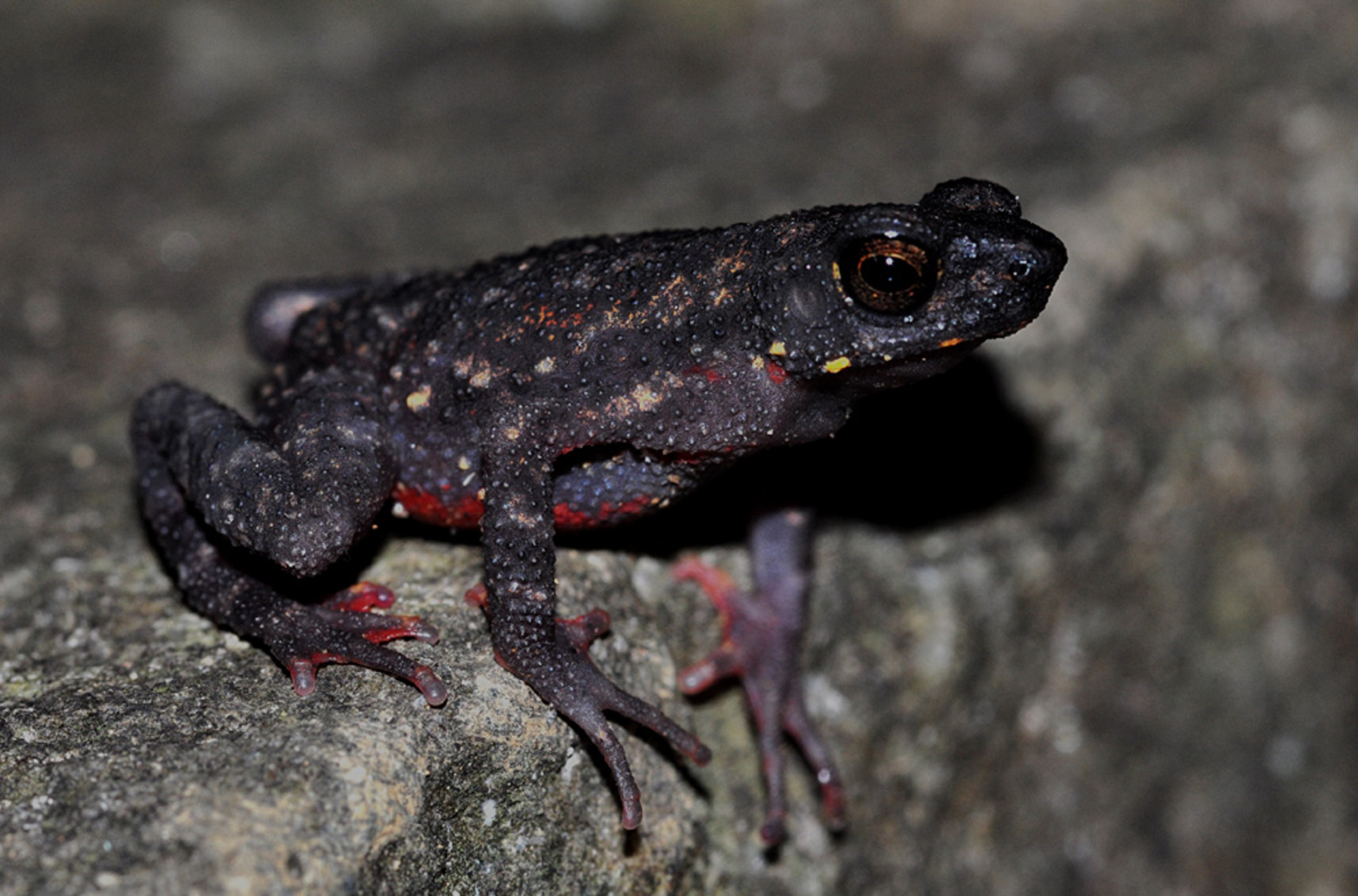
Lateral view

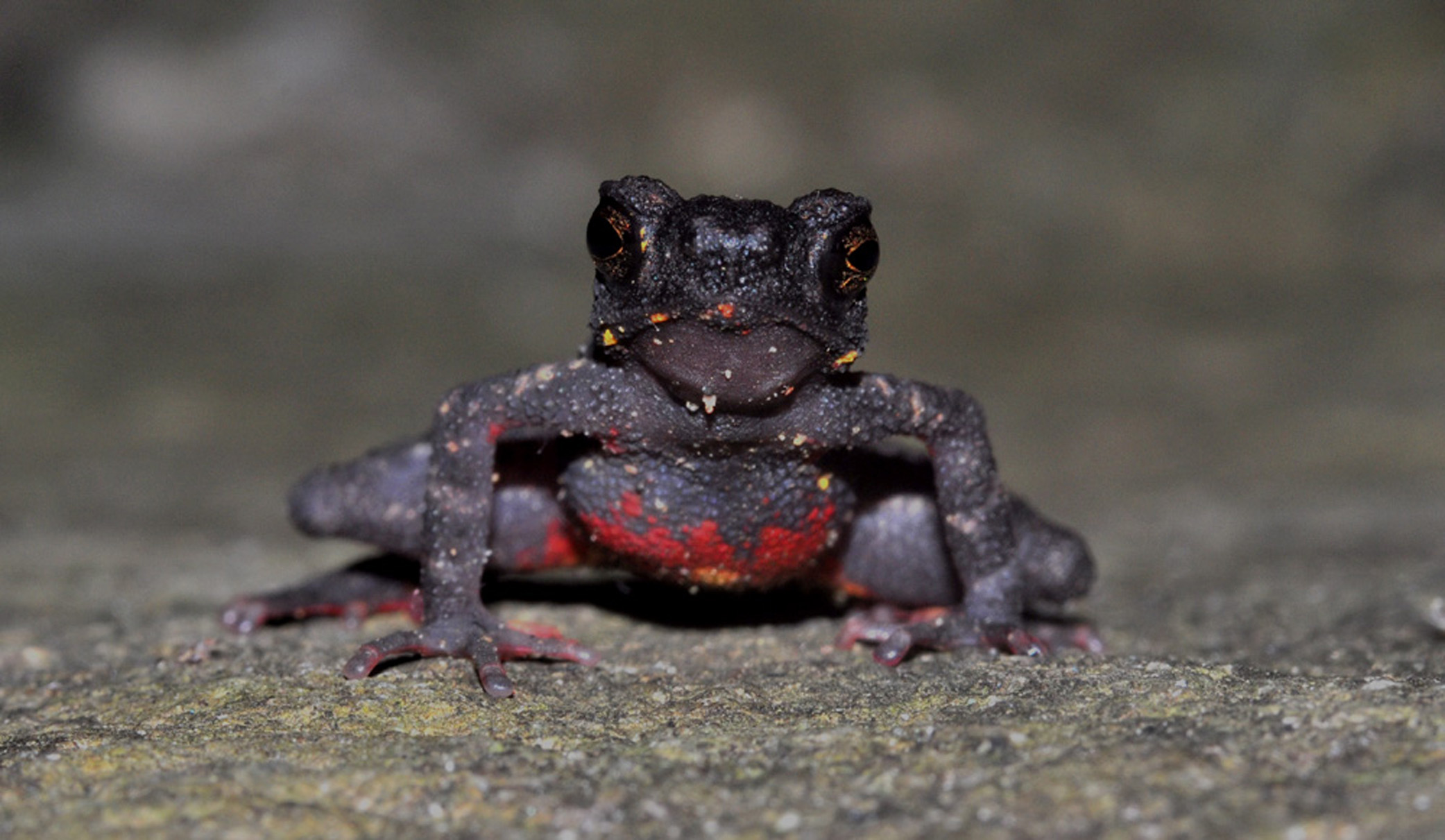
Front view

===== Ghatophryne rubigina (Kerala stream toad) =====
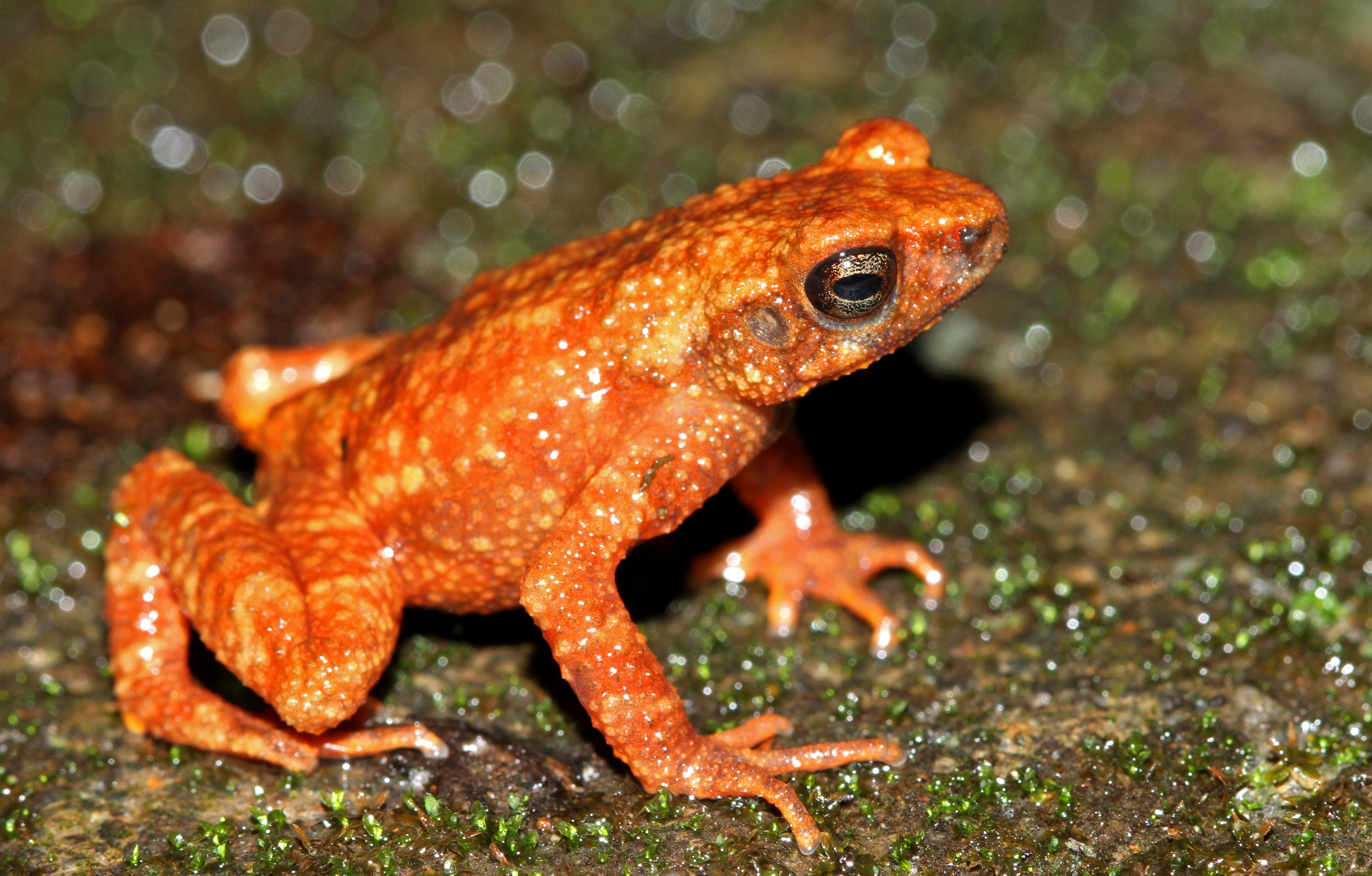
Lateral view

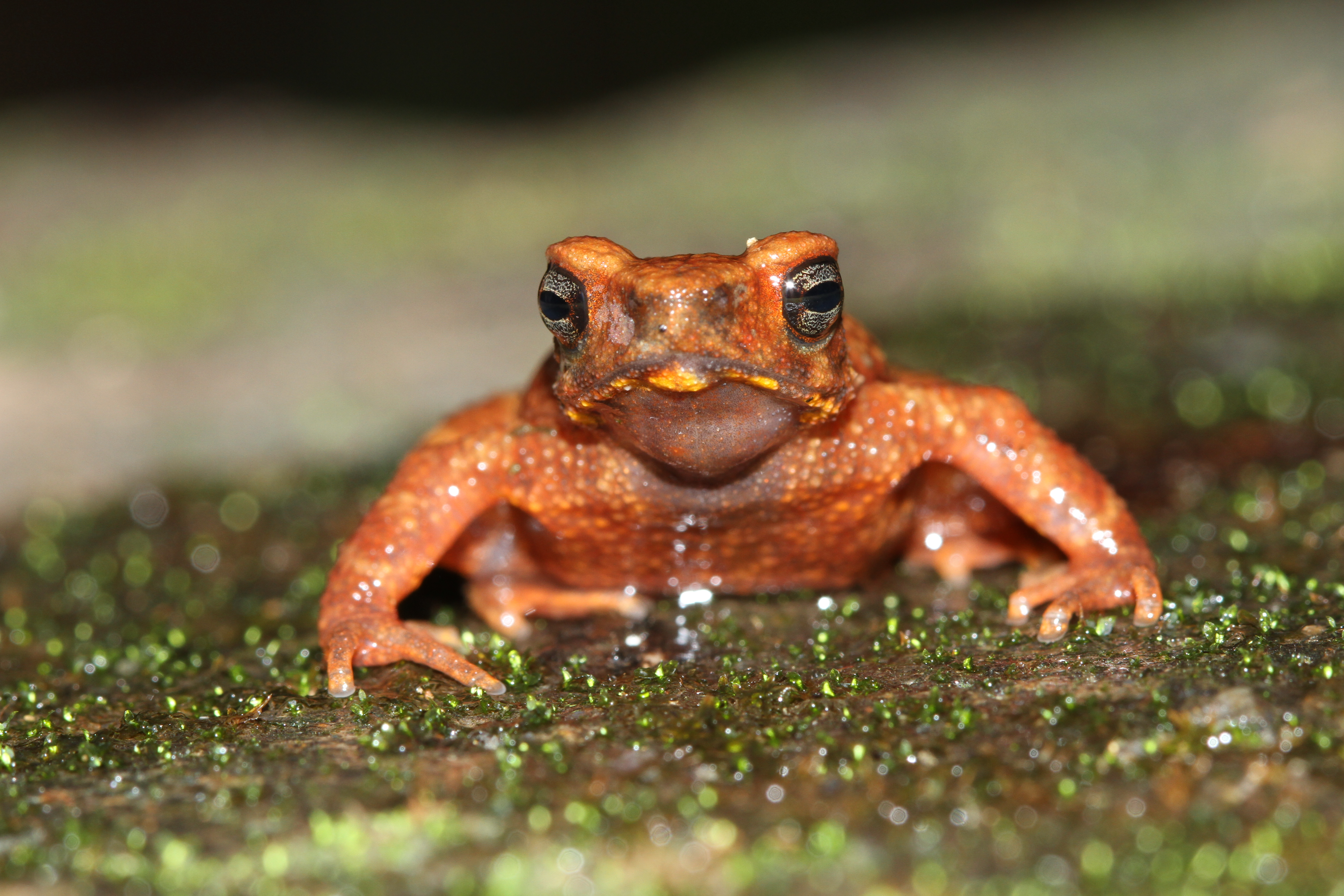
Front view

==== Genus: Pedostibes ====
===== Pedostibes tuberculosus (Malabar tree toad) =====
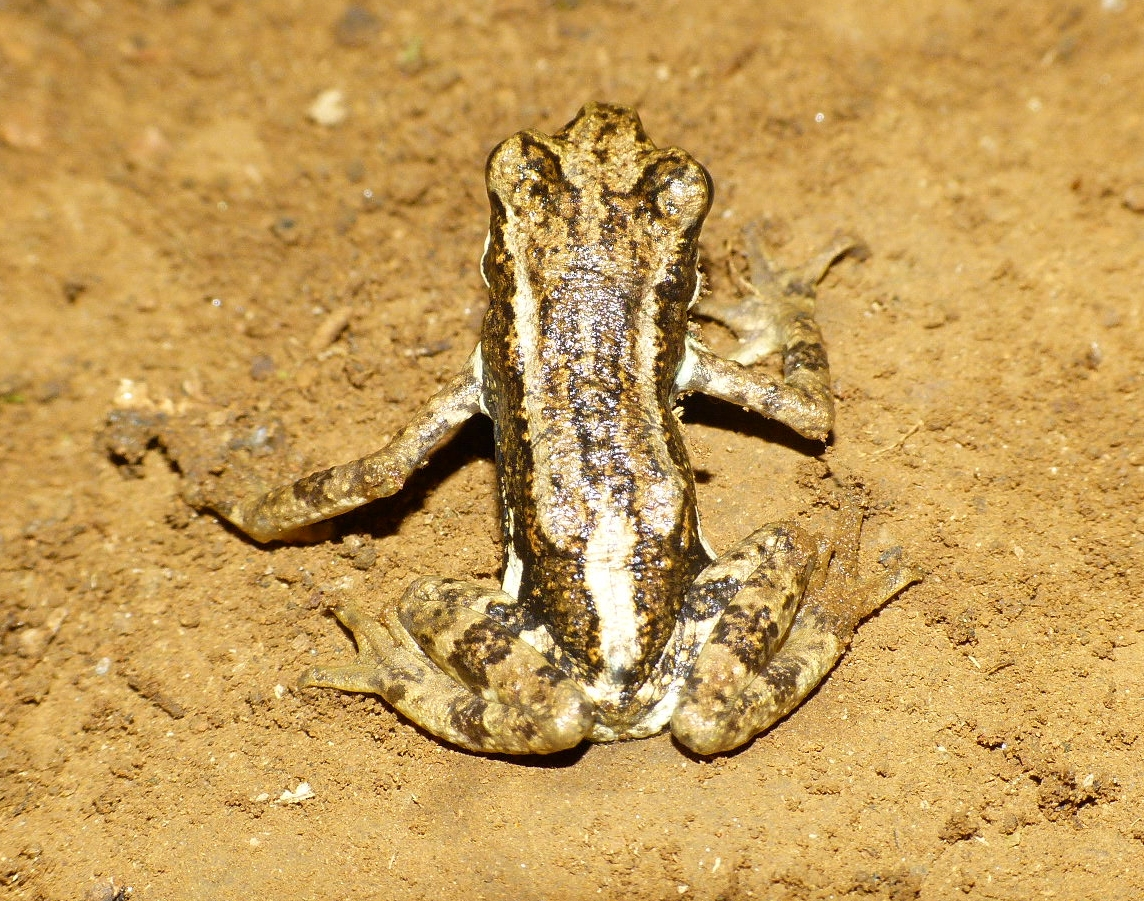
Dorsal view

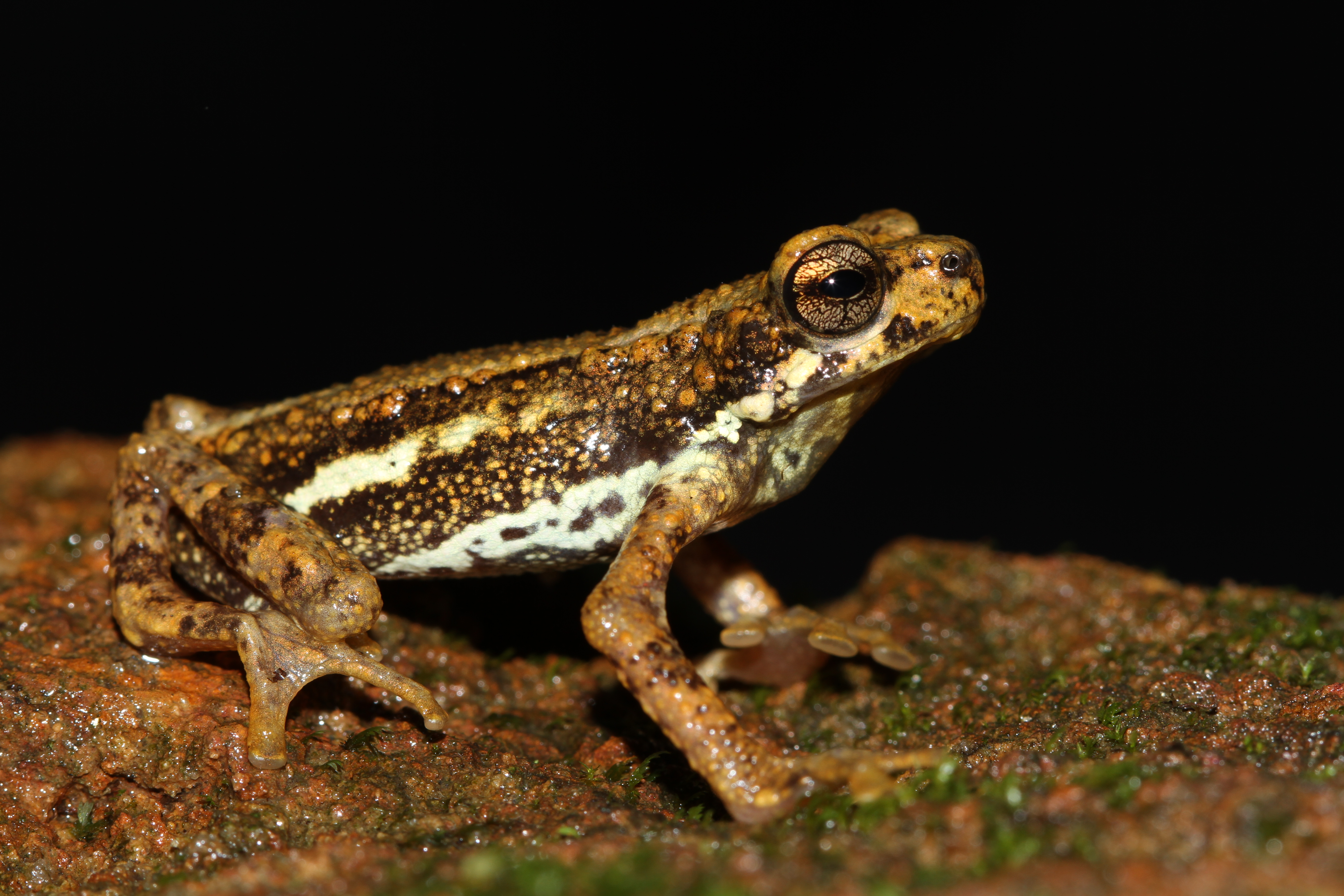
Lateral view

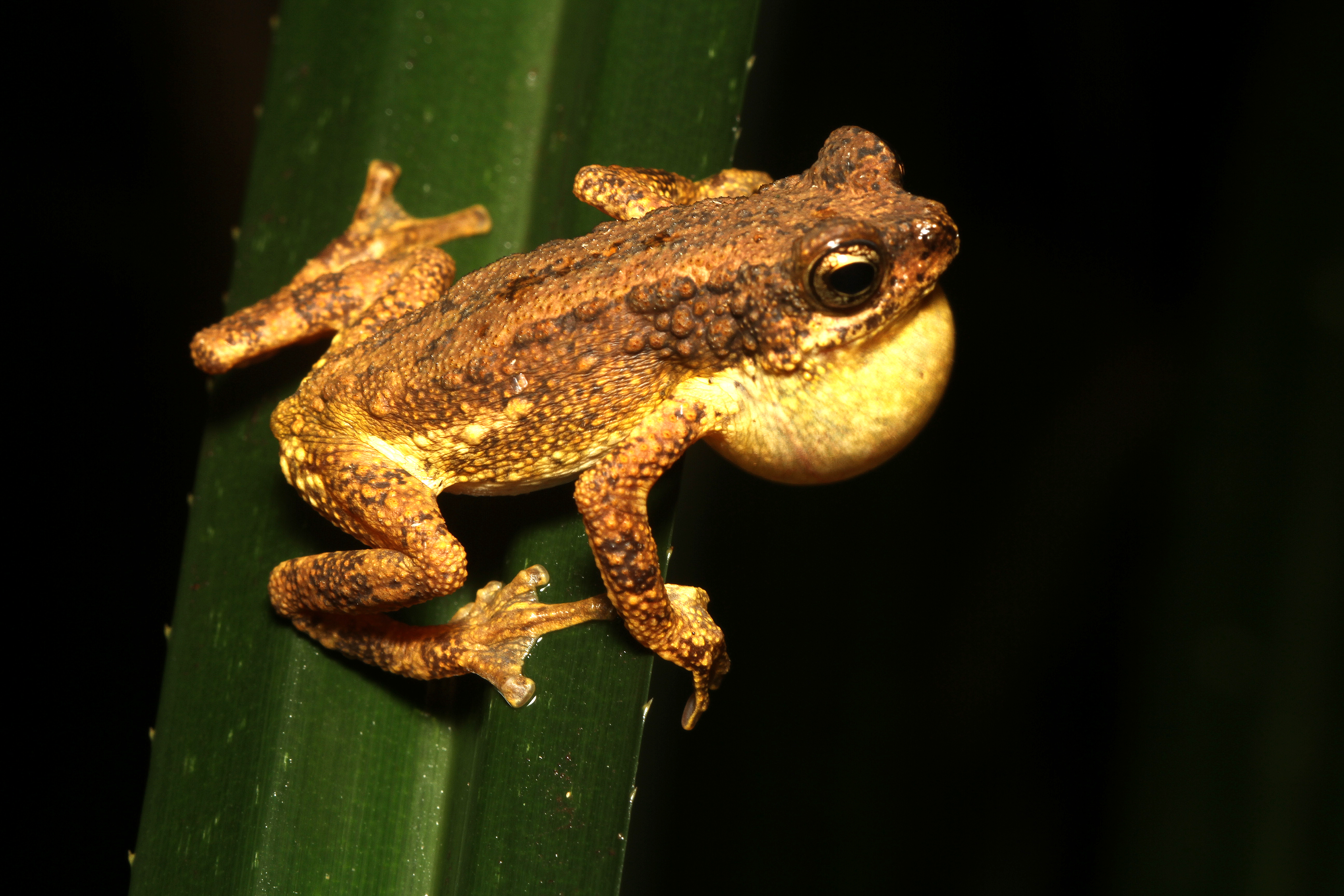
Calling

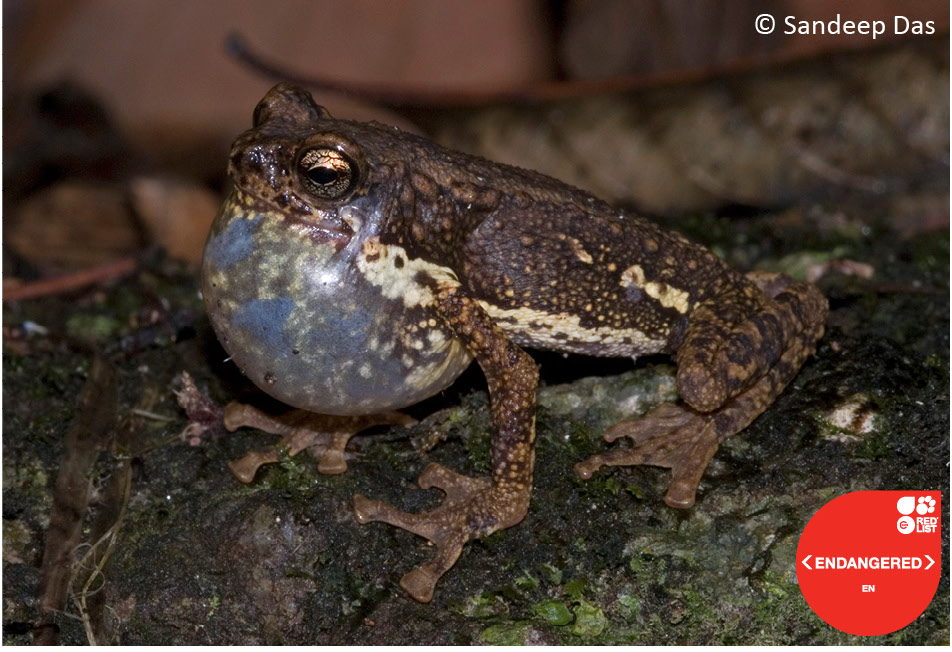
Calling

=== Family: Dicroglossidae (fork-tongued frogs) ===
==== Genus: Euphlyctis ====
===== Euphlyctis cyanophlyctis (skittering frog) =====
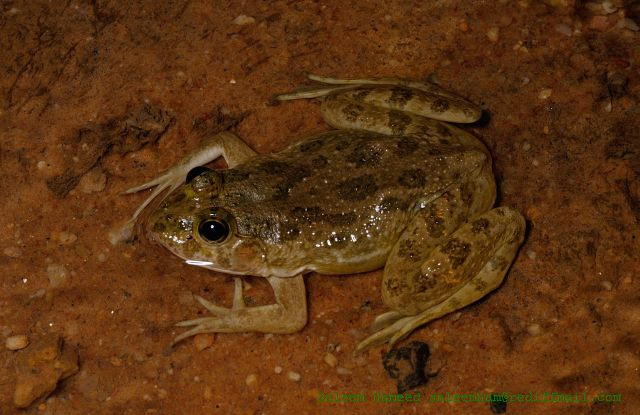
Dorsal view

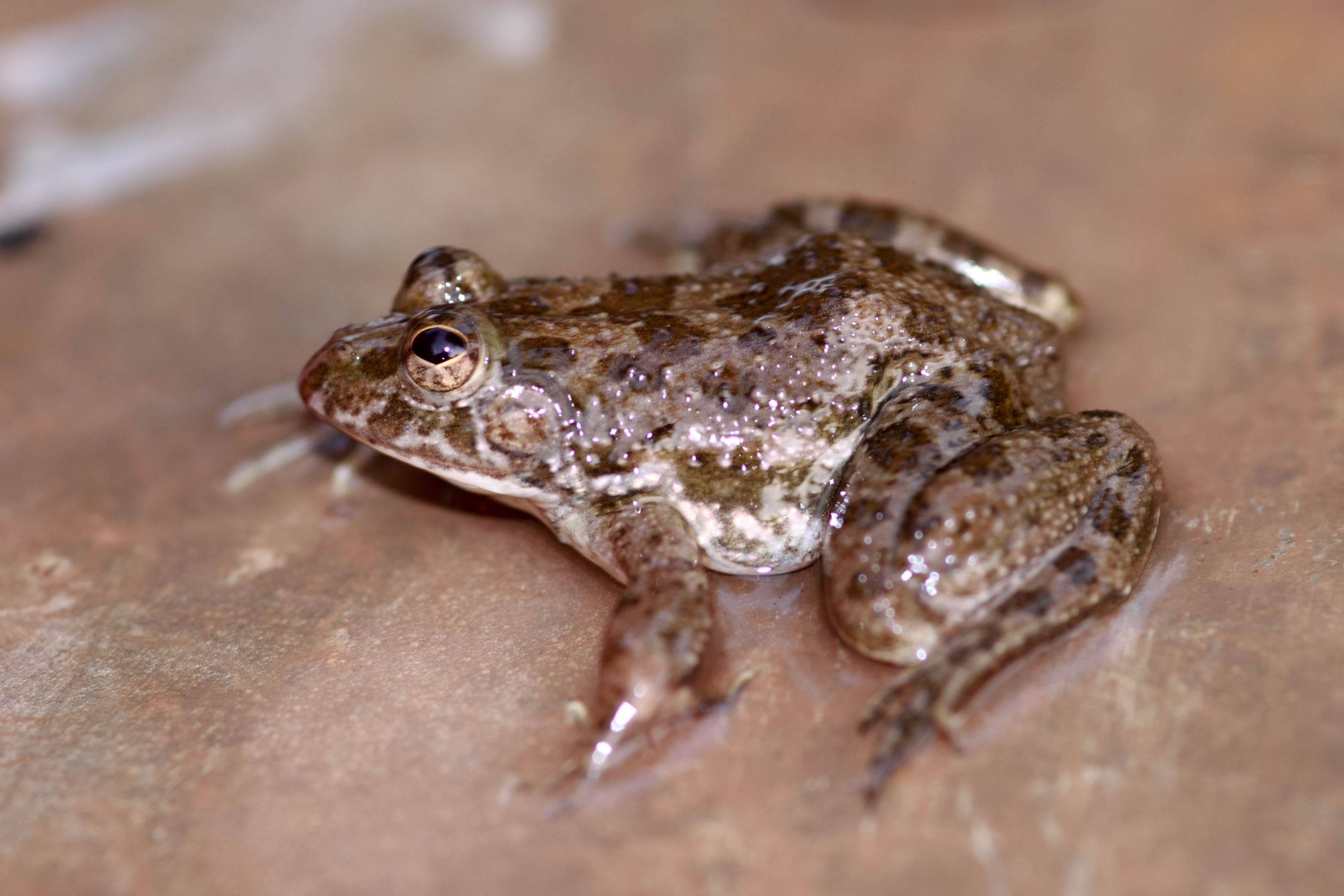
Lateral view

===== Euphlyctis hexadactylus (green pond frog) =====
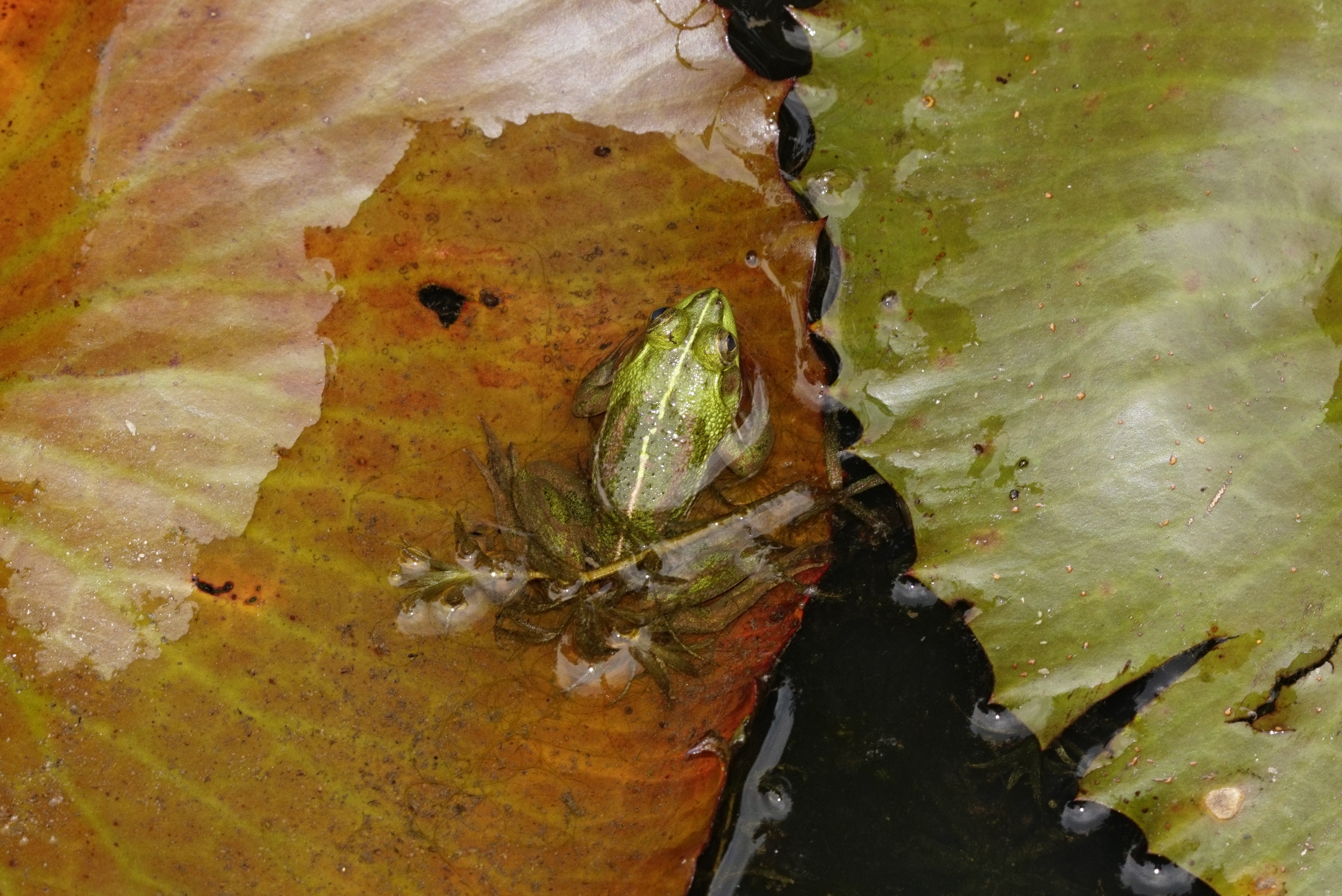
Dorsal view

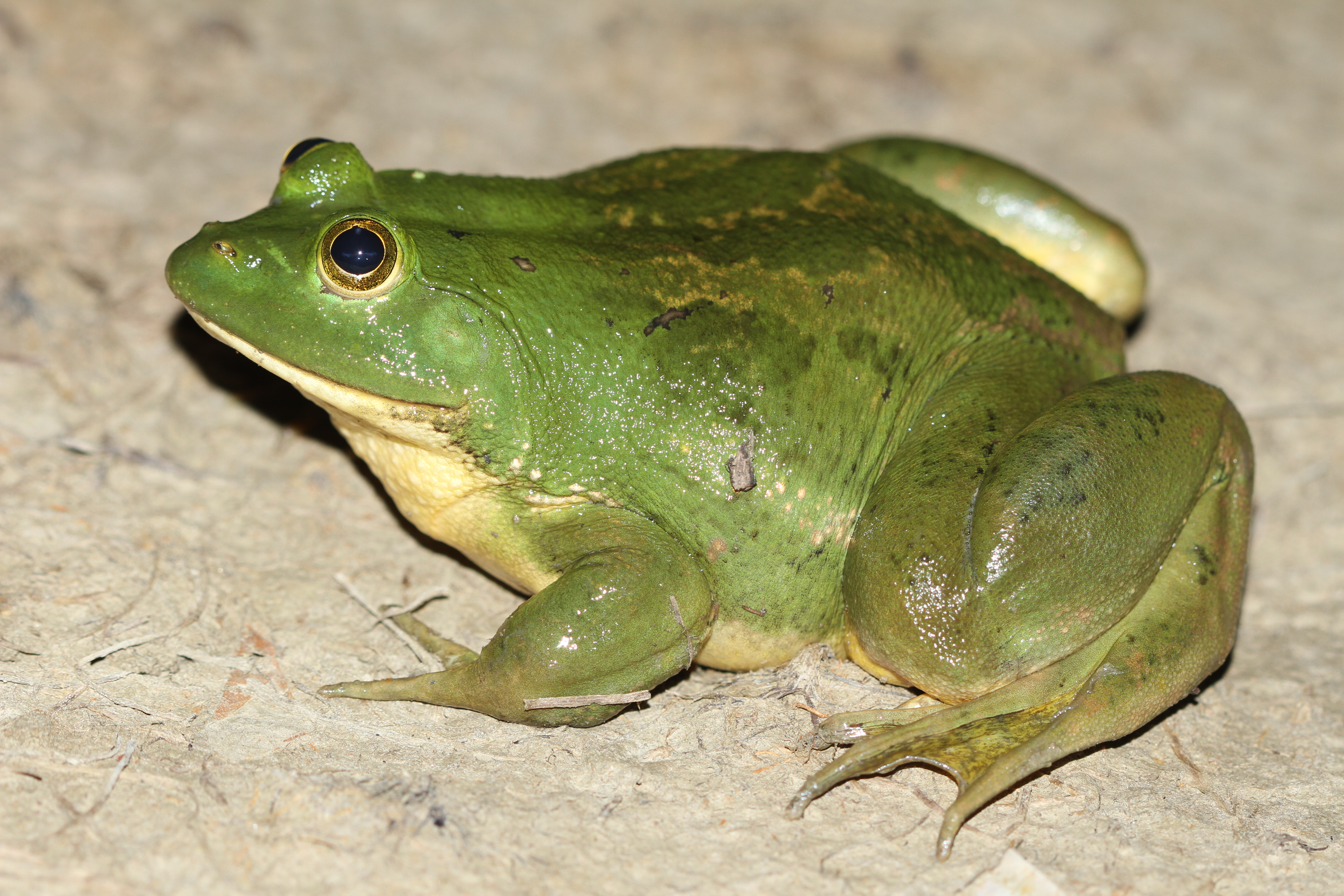
Lateral view

==== Genus: Hoplobatrachus ====
===== Hoplobatrachus crassus (Jerdon's bullfrog) =====
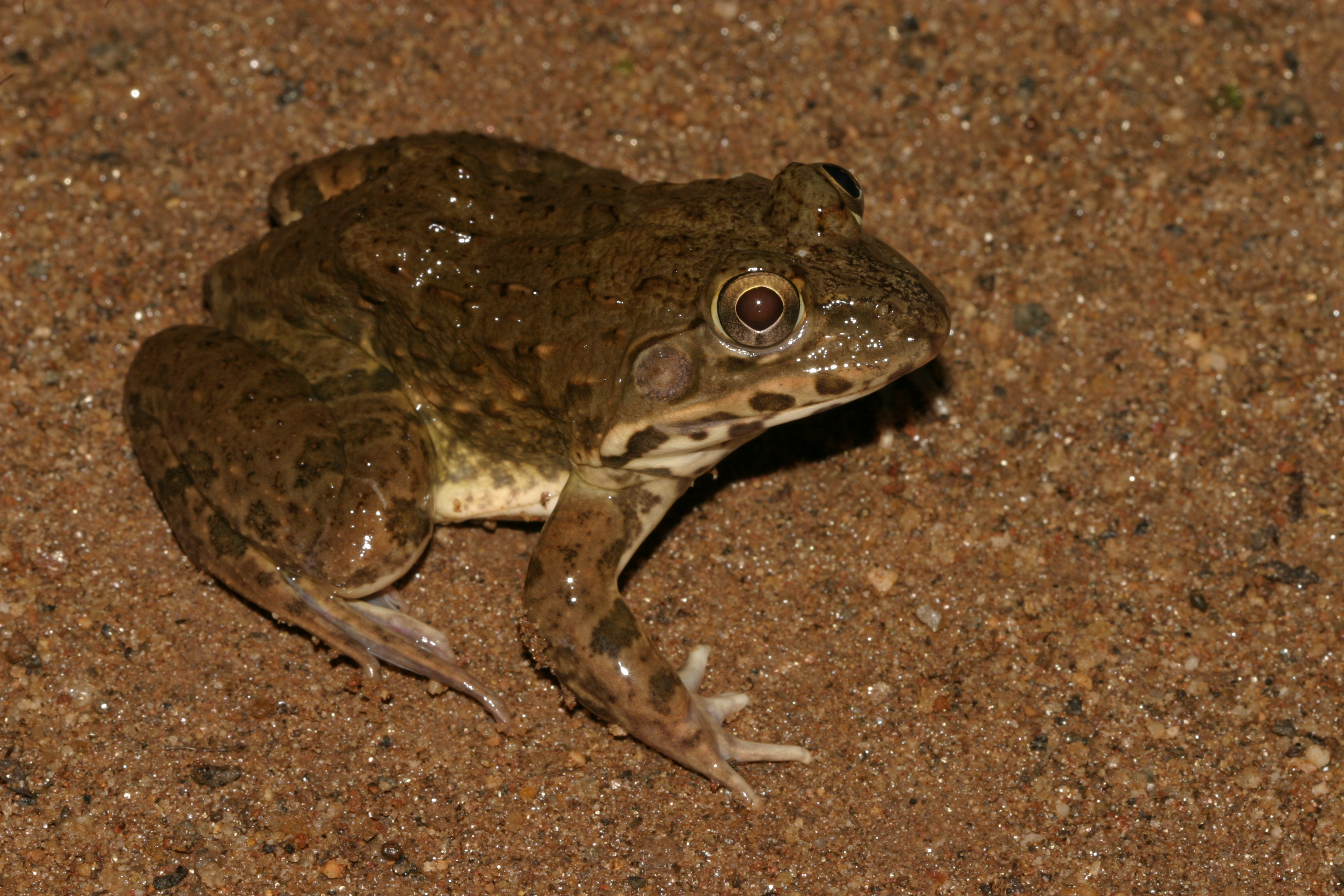
Dorsal view

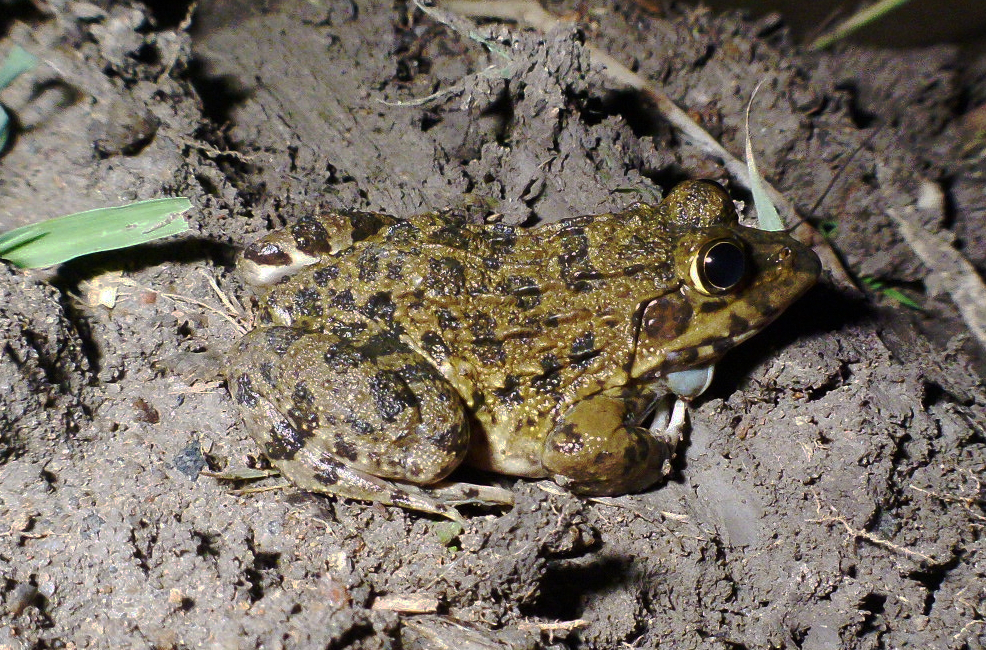
Lateral view

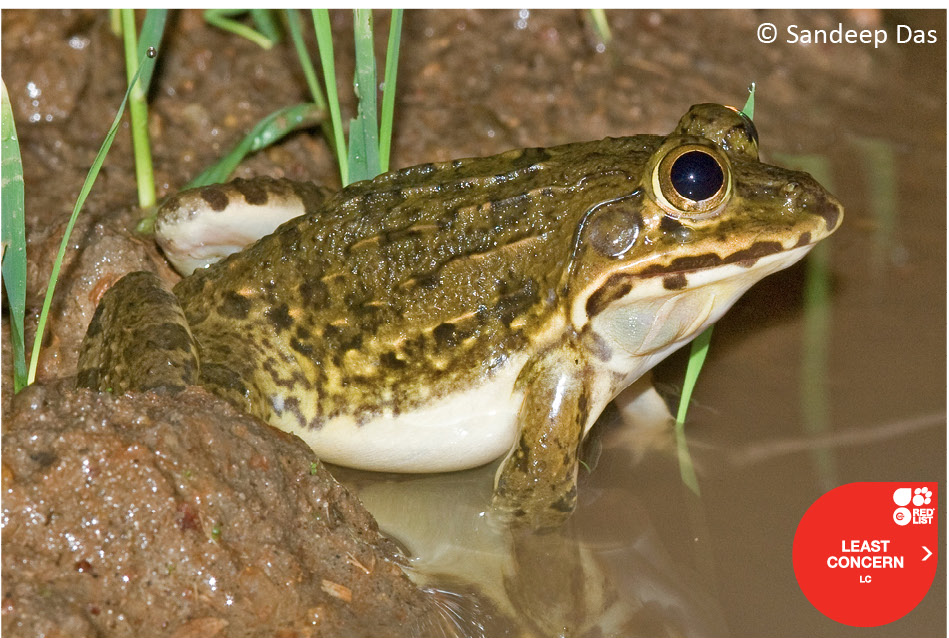
Lateral view

===== Hoplobatrachus tigerinus (Indian bullfrog) =====
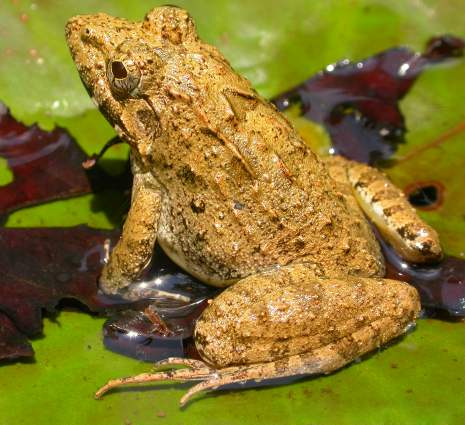
Dorsal view

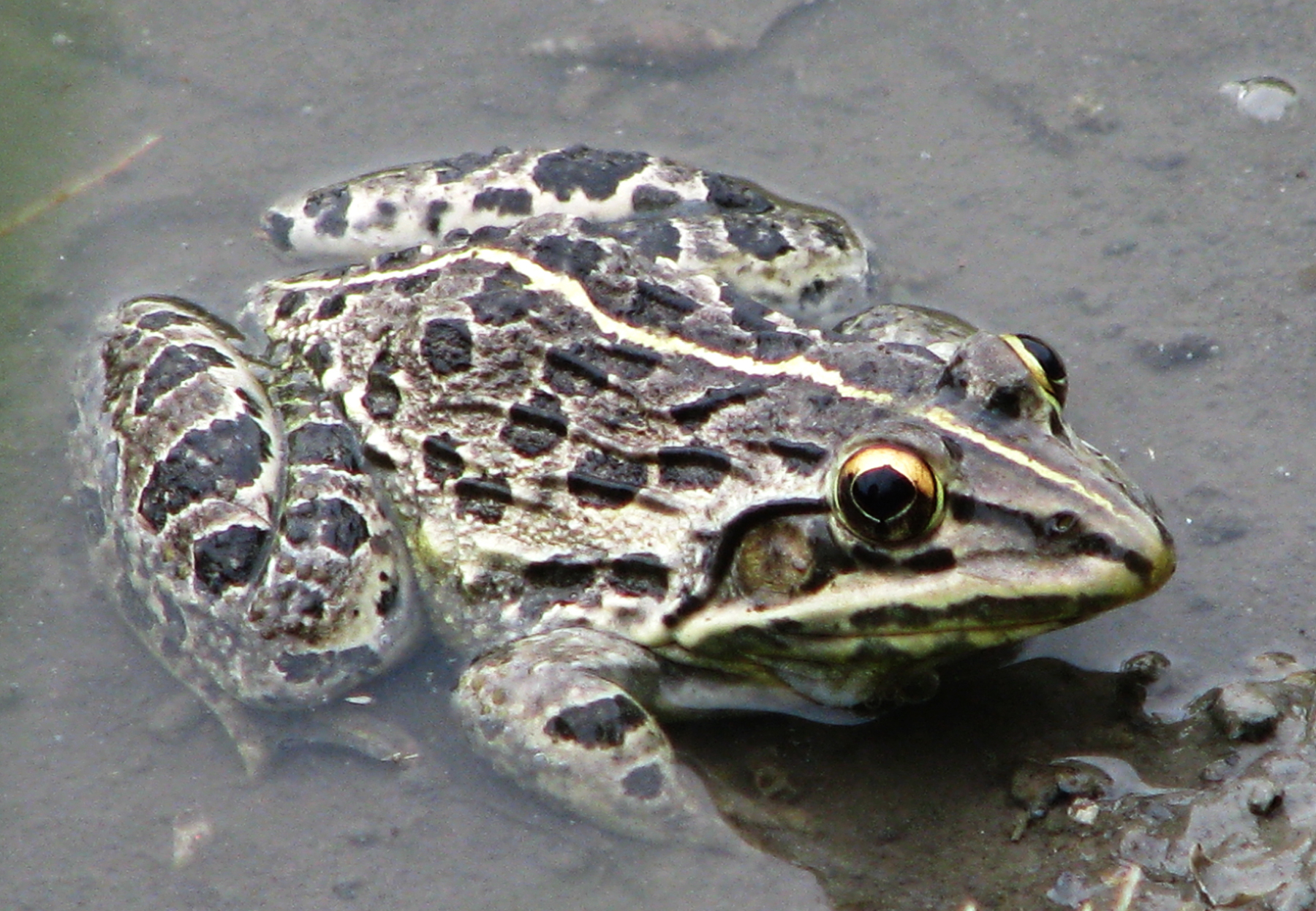
Lateral view

==== Genus: Minervarya ====
===== Minervarya sahyadris (Minervarya frog) =====
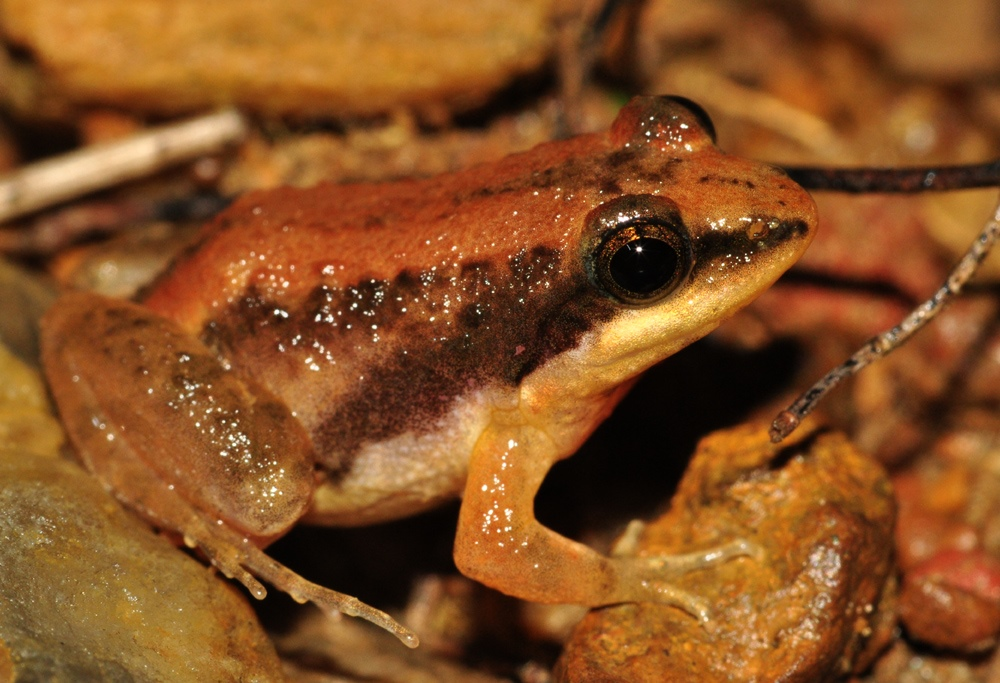
Lateral view

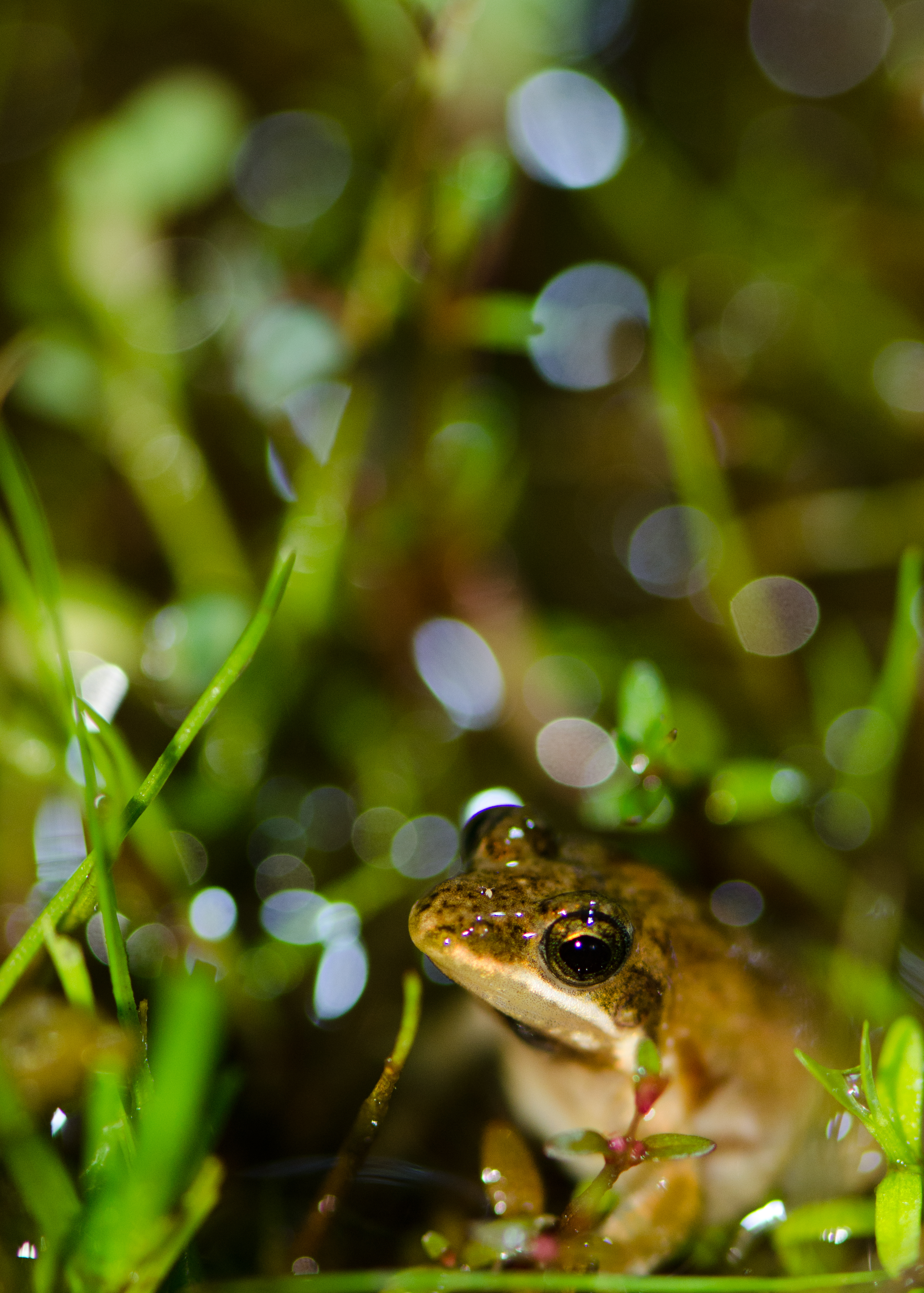
Front view

==== Genus: Sphaerotheca ====
===== Sphaerotheca breviceps (Indian burrowing frog) =====
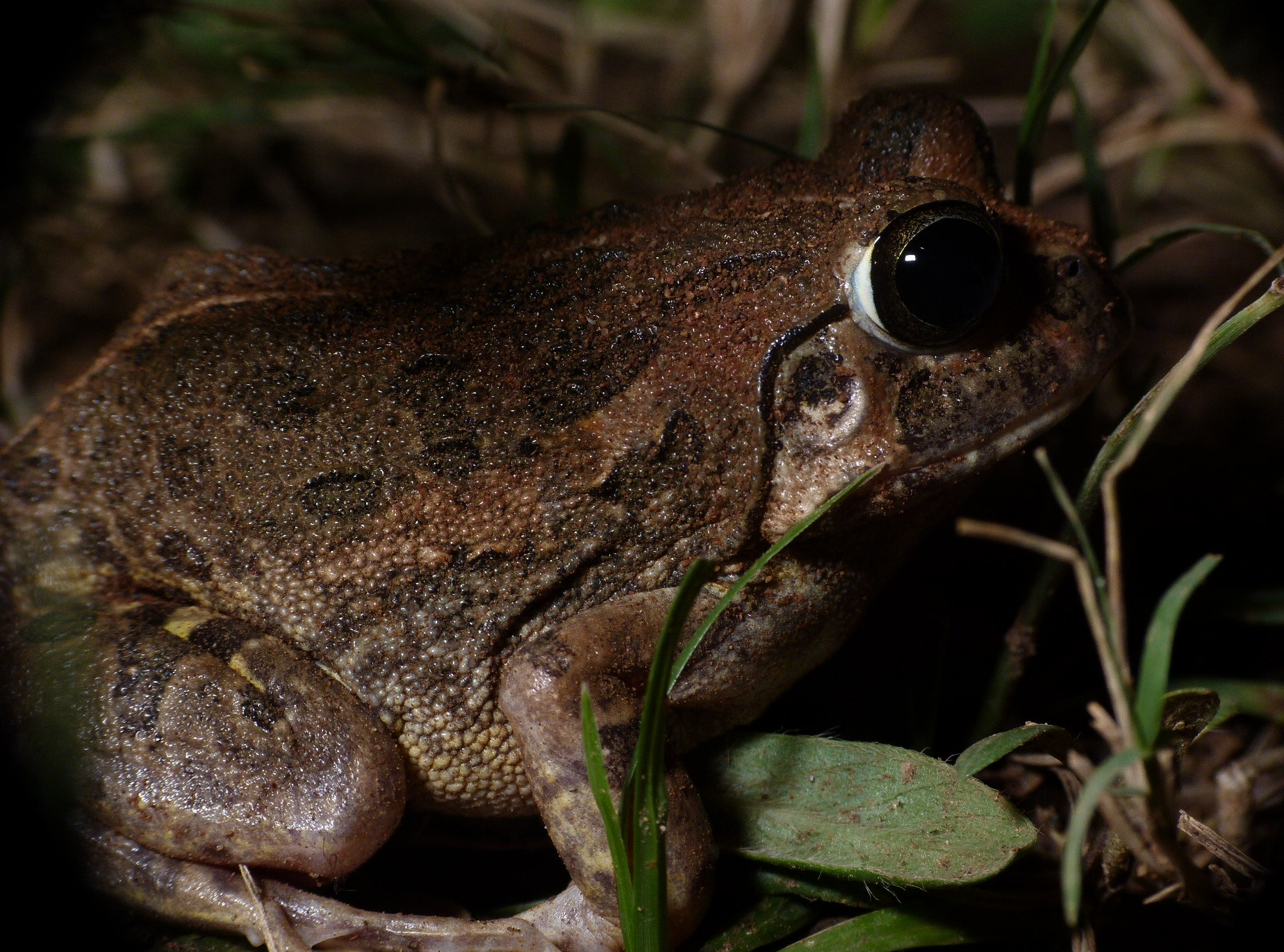
Lateral view

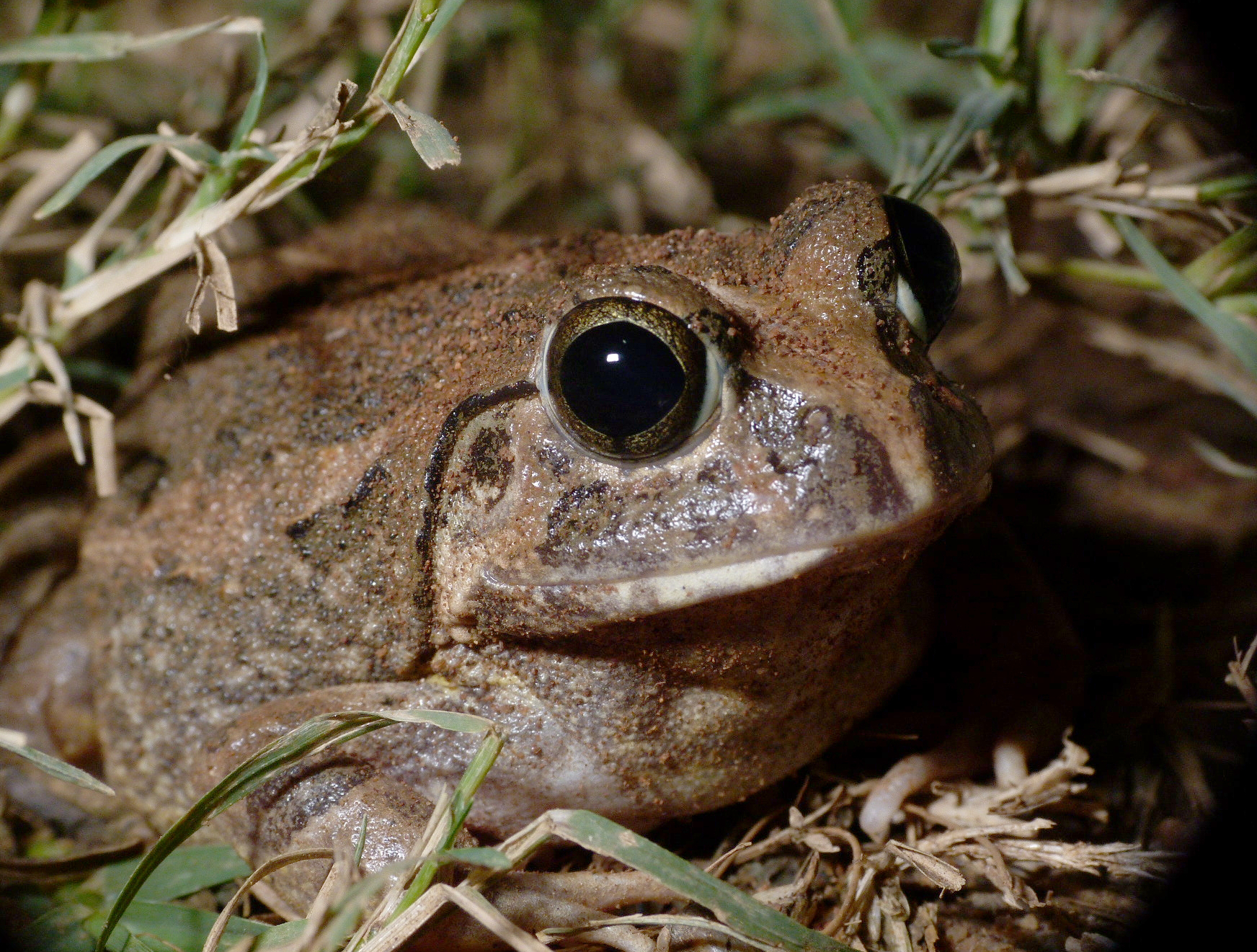
Front view

==== Genus: Zakerana ====
===== Zakerana keralensis (Kerala warty frog) =====
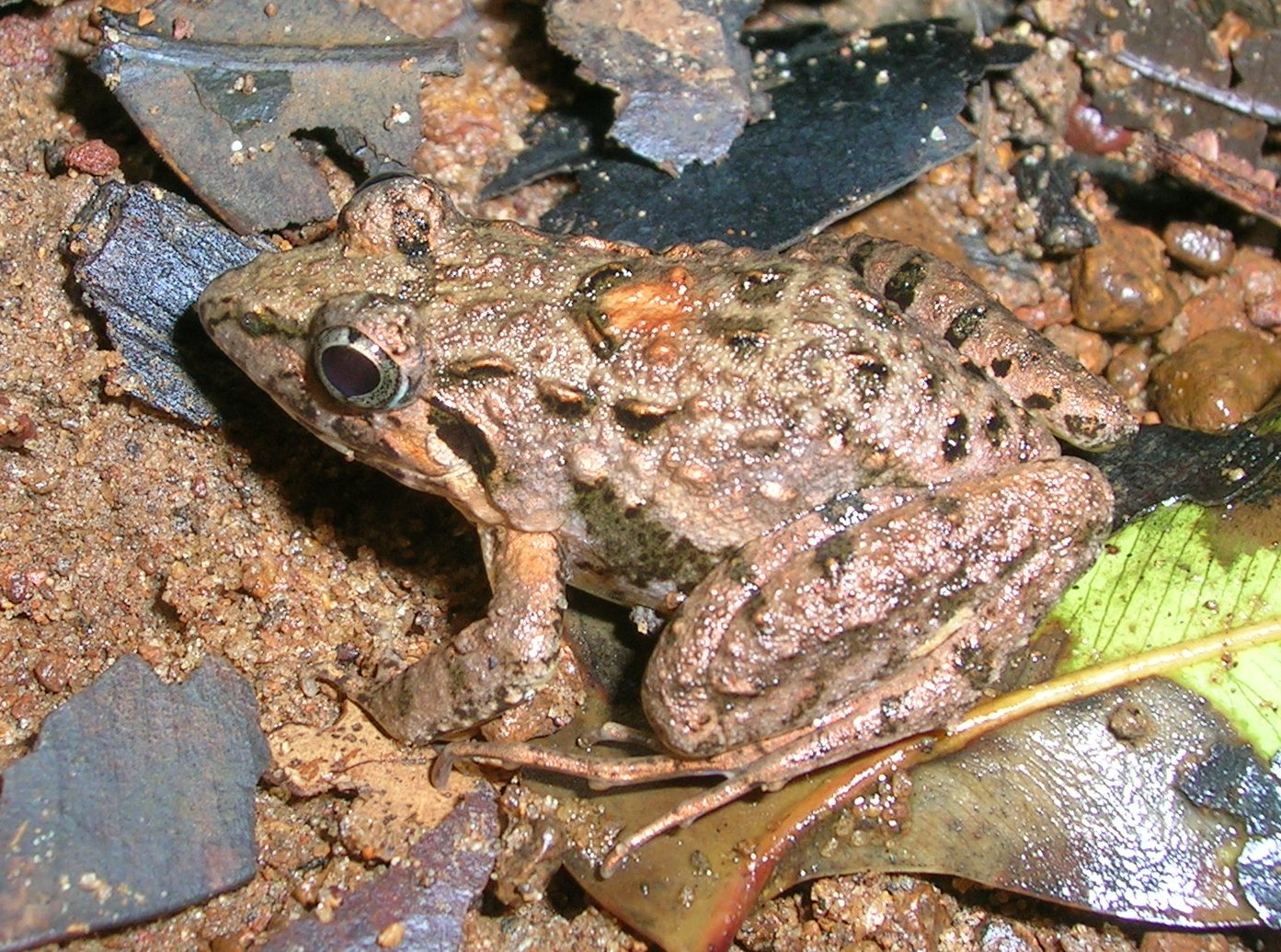
Dorsal view

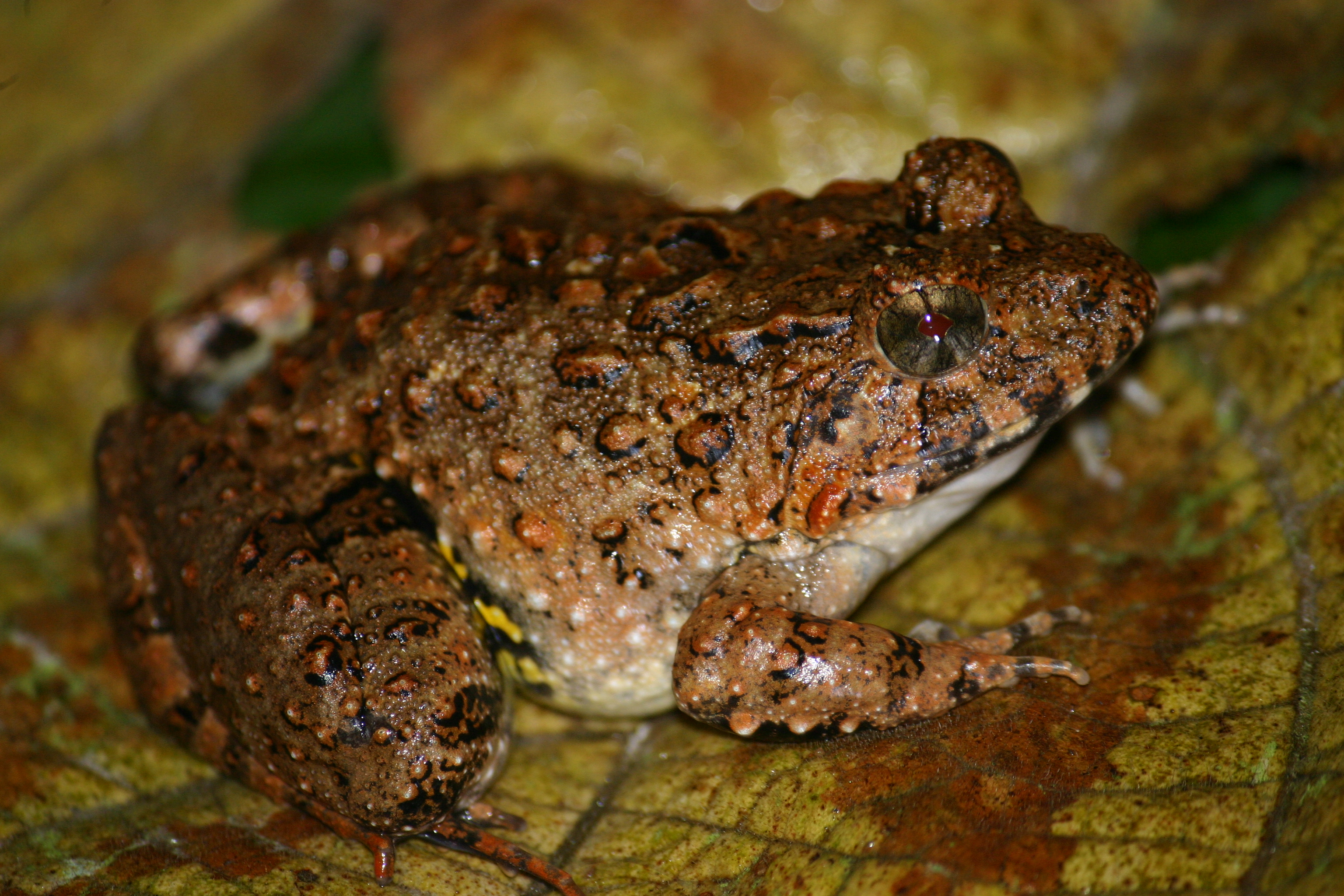
Lateral view

===== Zakerana rufescens (Malabar wart frog) =====
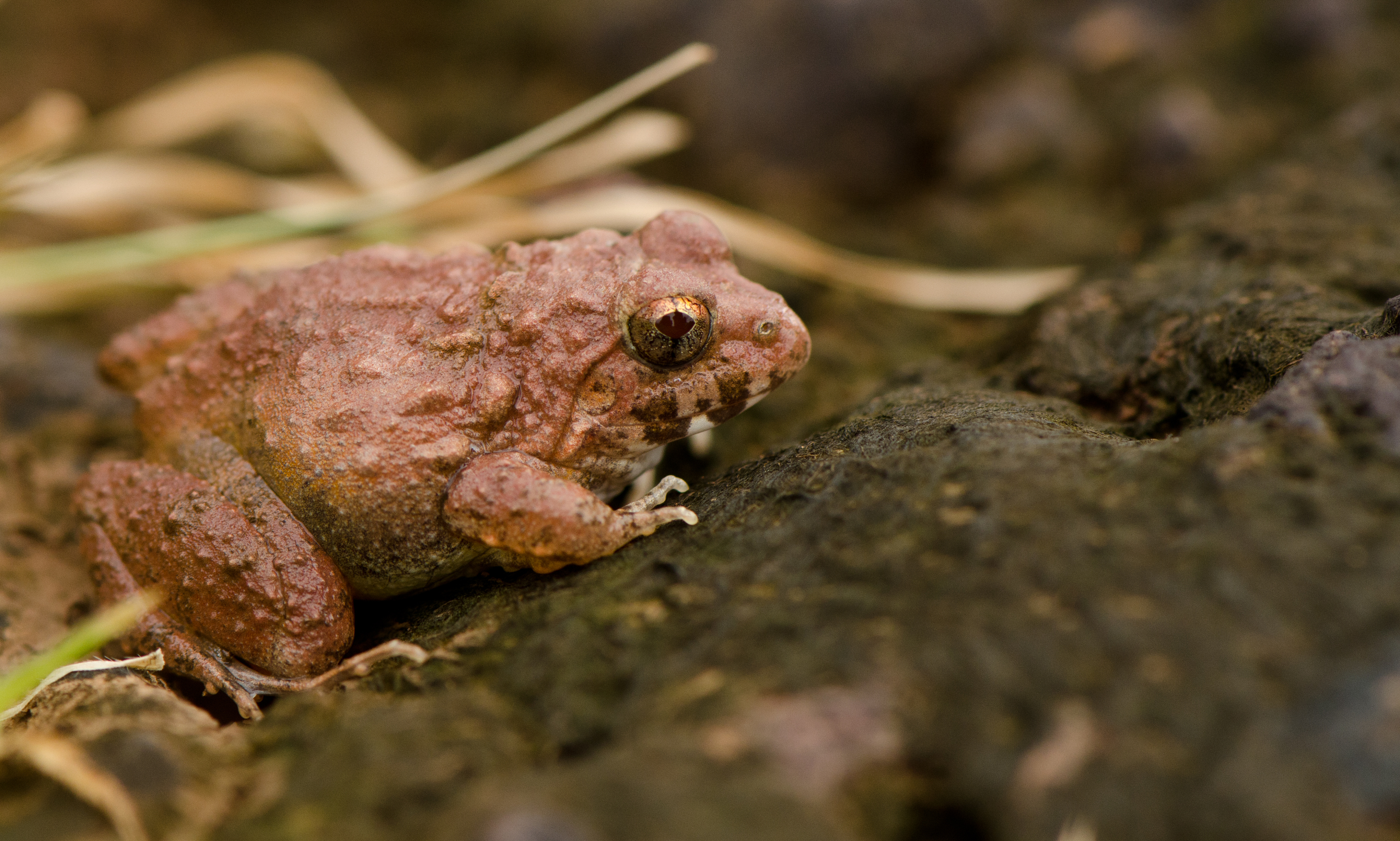
Lateral view

=== Family: Micrixalidae (dancing frogs) ===
==== Genus: Micrixalus ====
===== Micrixalus adonis =====
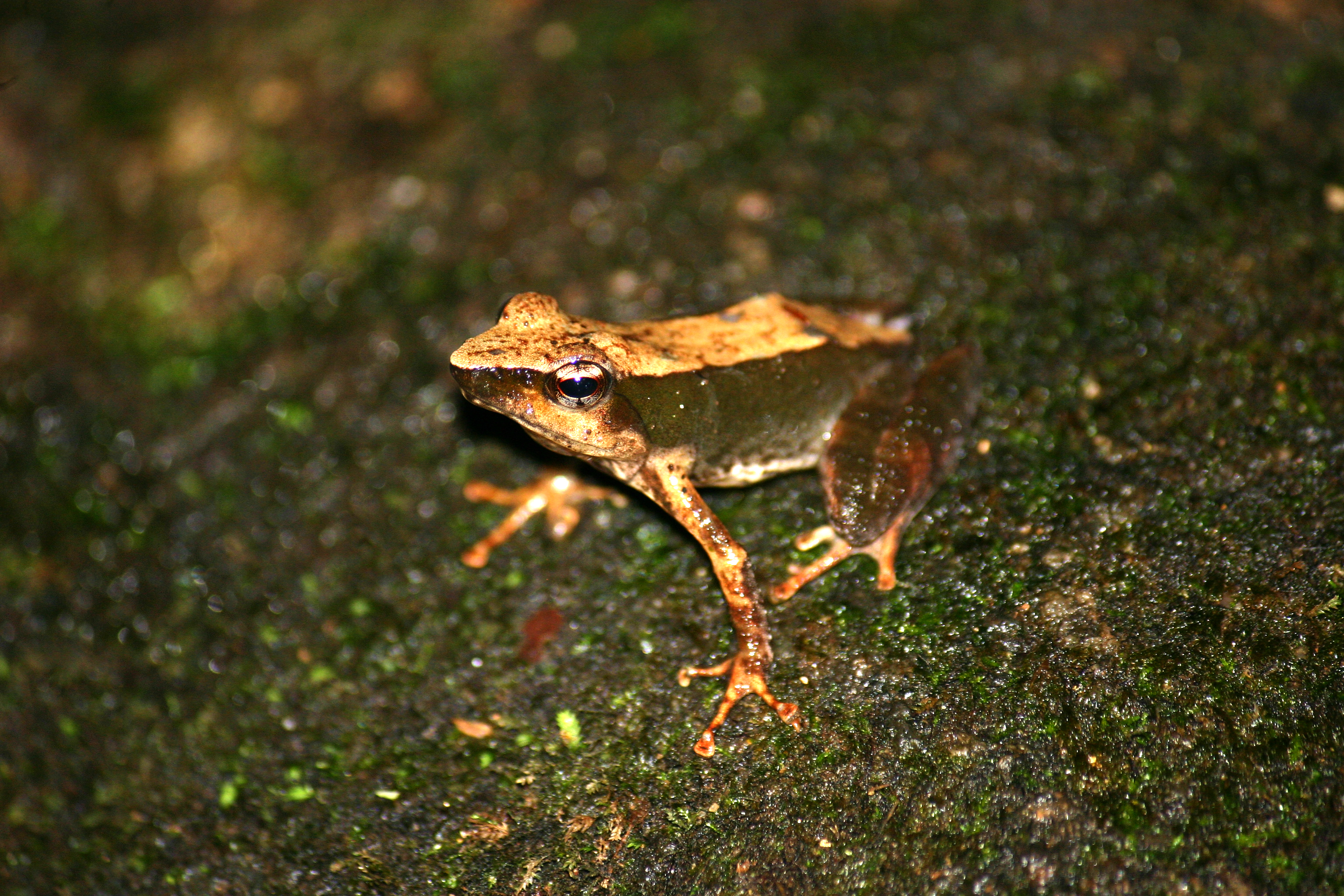
Lateral view

===== Micrixalus elegans (elegant dancing frog) =====
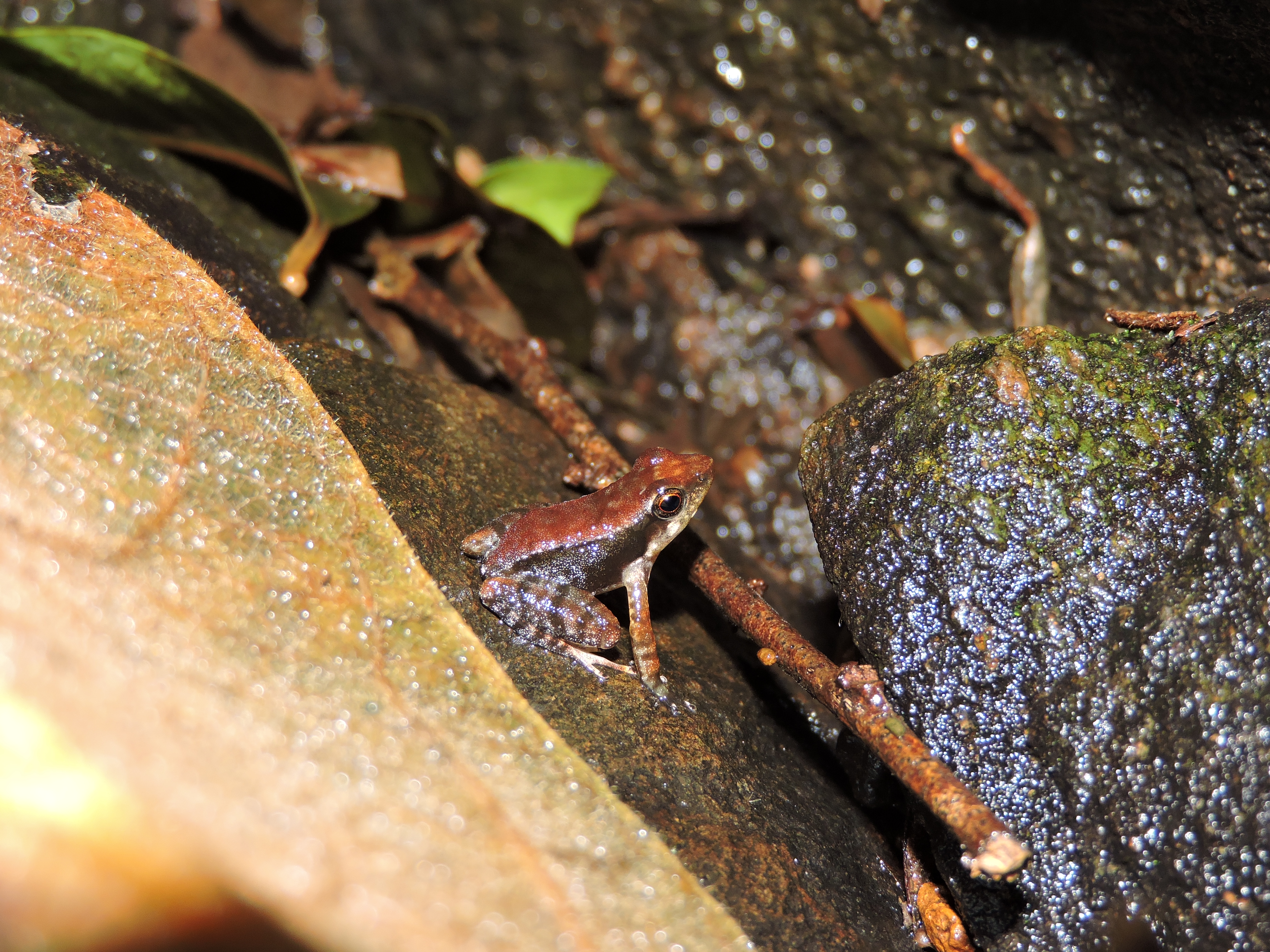
Lateral view

===== Micrixalus fuscus (dusky torrent frog) =====
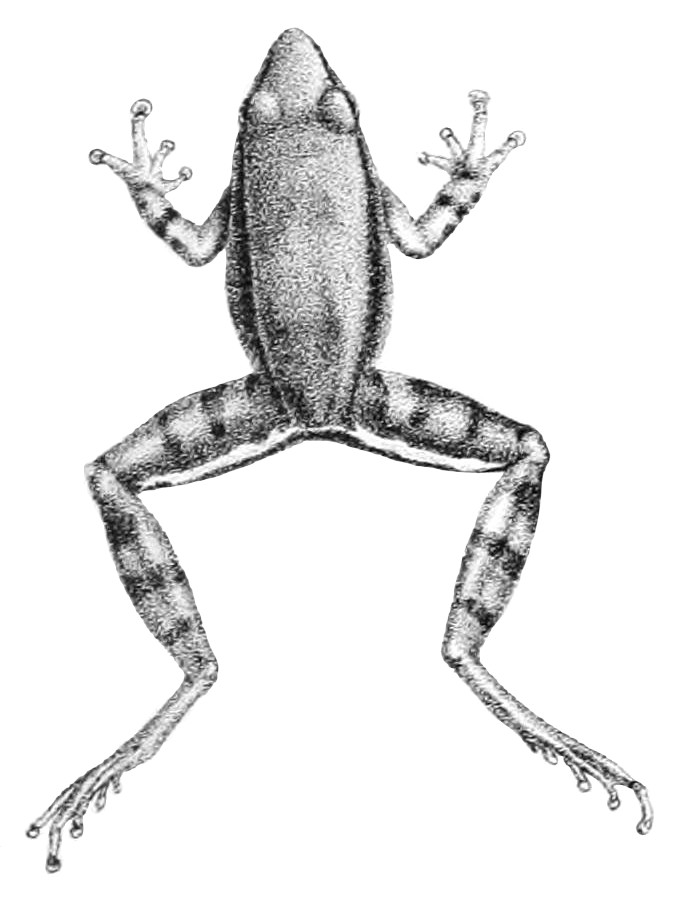
Illustration

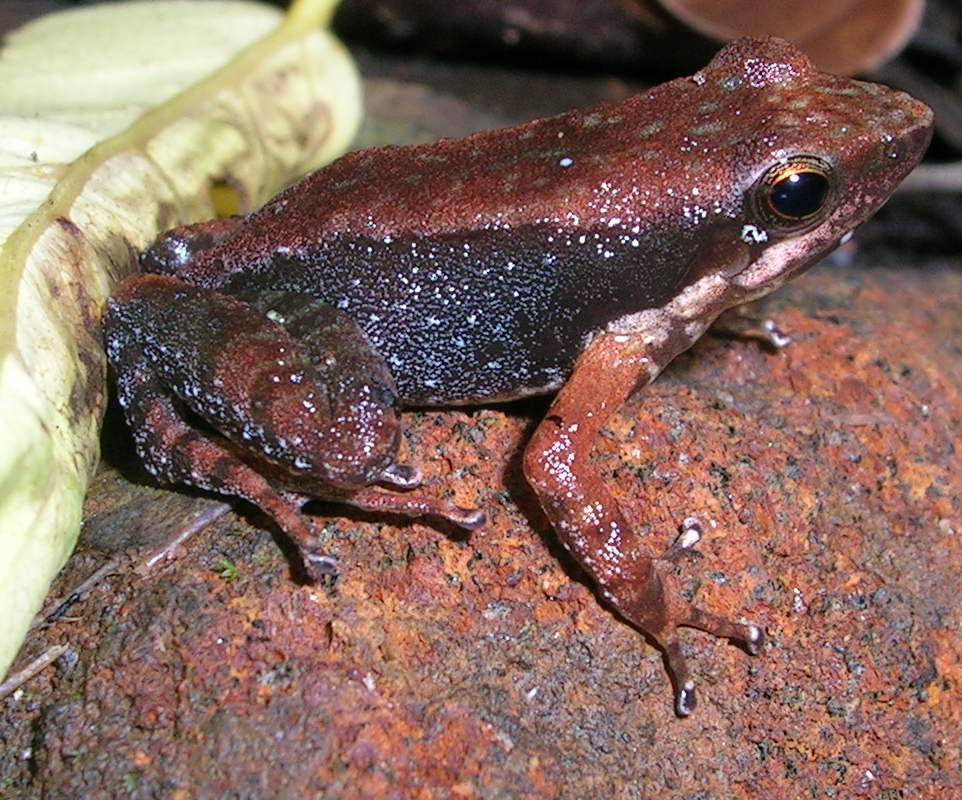
Lateral view

===== Micrixalus gadgili (Gadgil's torrent frog) =====
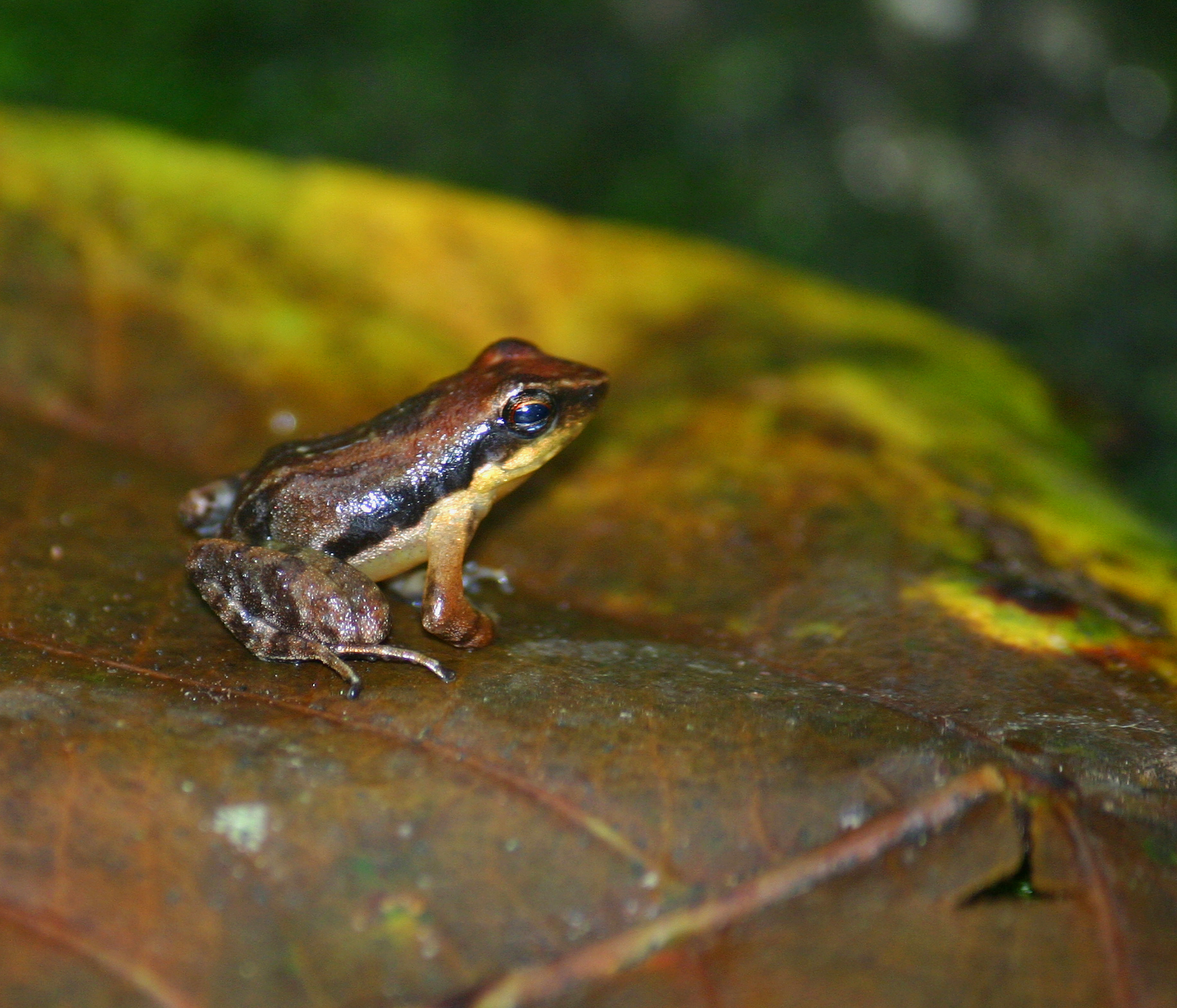
lateral view

===== Micrixalus nelliyampathi (Nelliyampathi torrent frog) =====
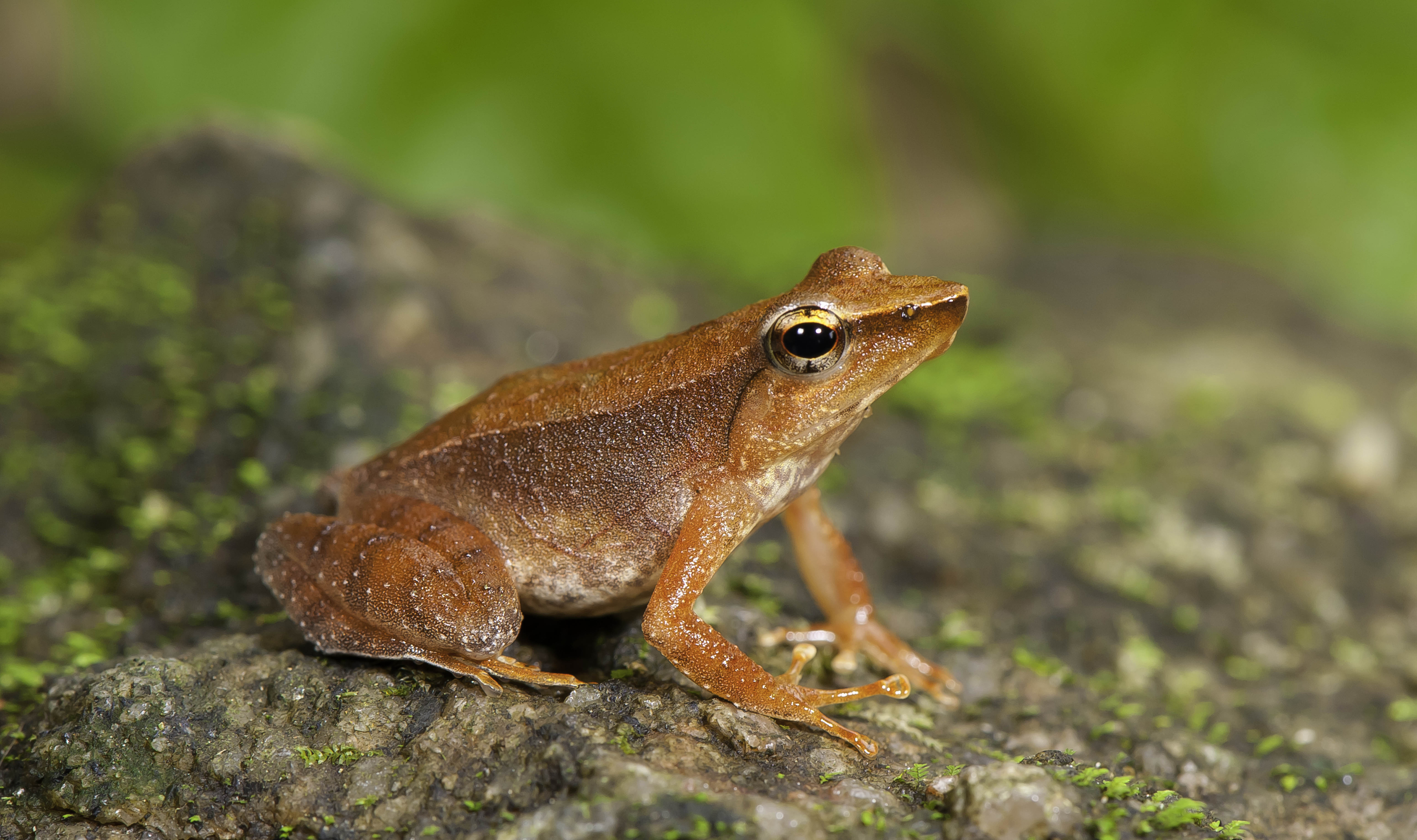
Lateral view

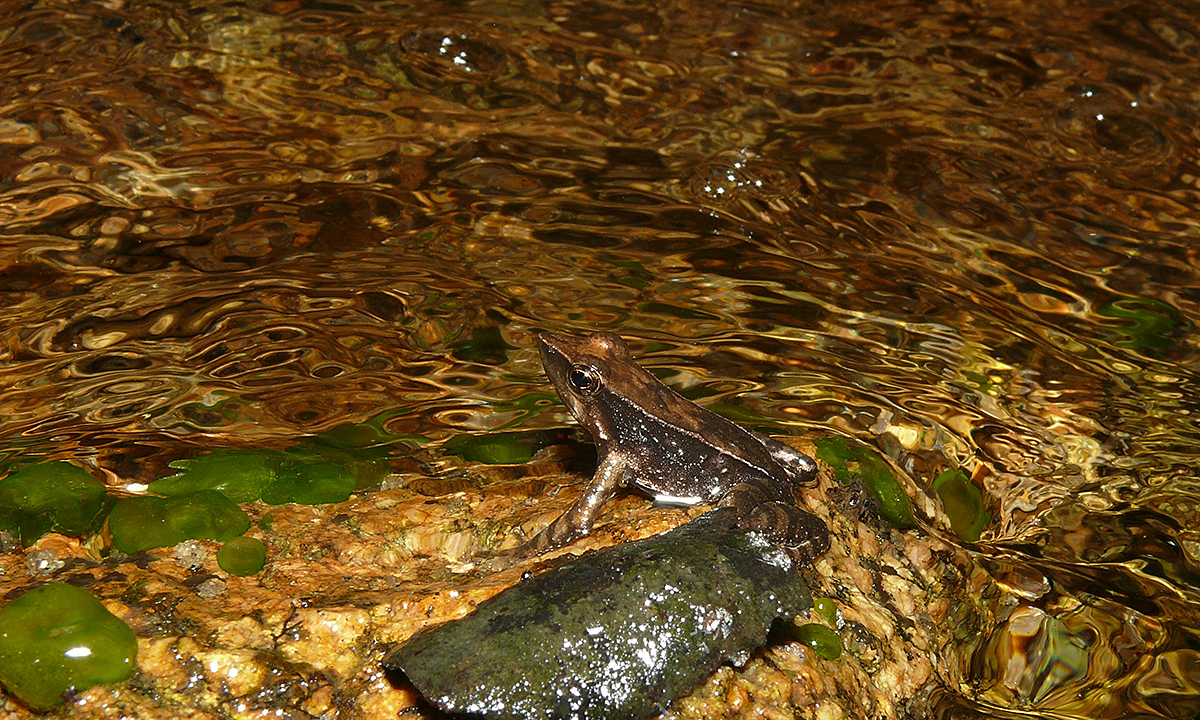
Lateral view

===== Micrixalus phyllophilus (pink-thighed torrent frog) =====
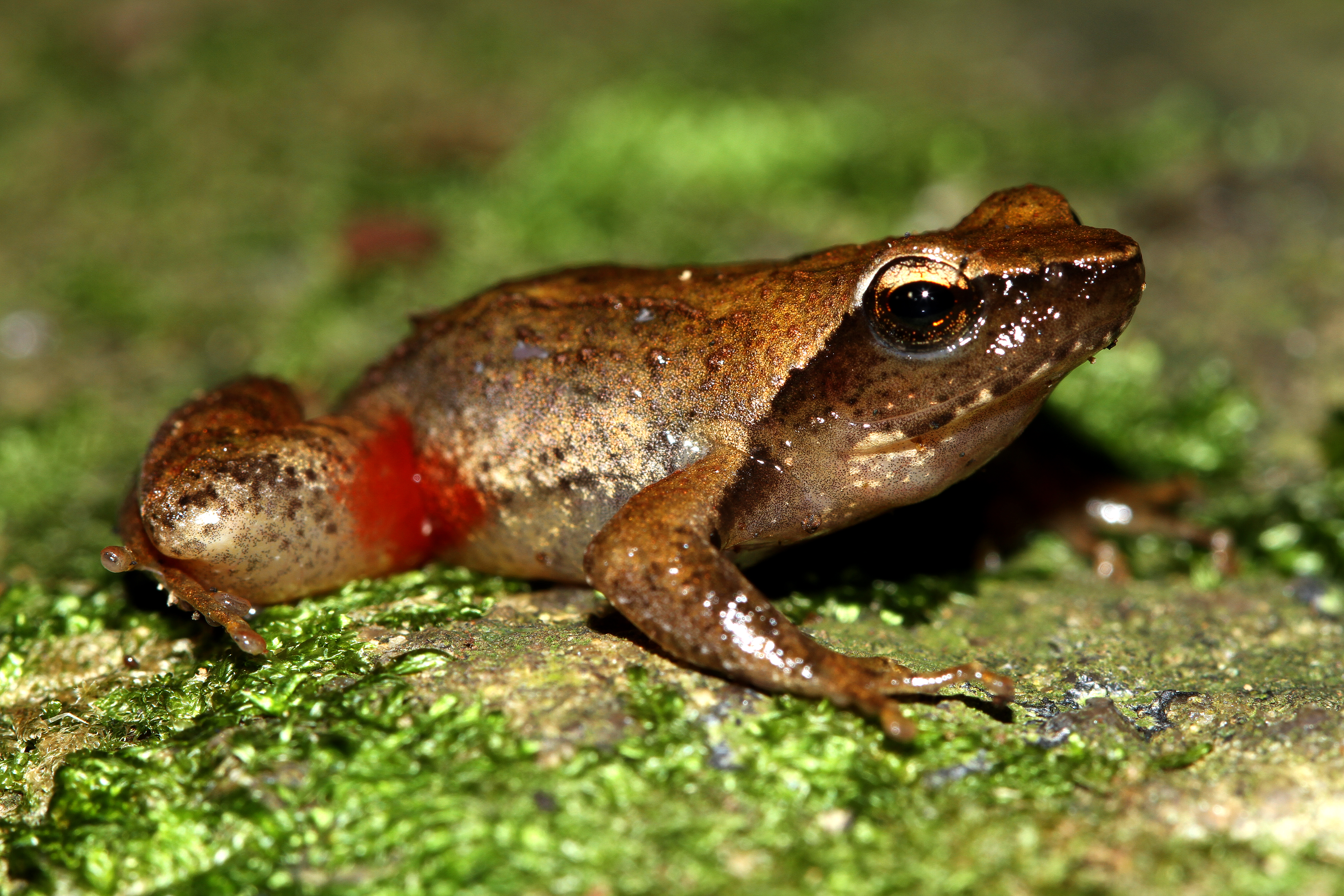
Lateral view

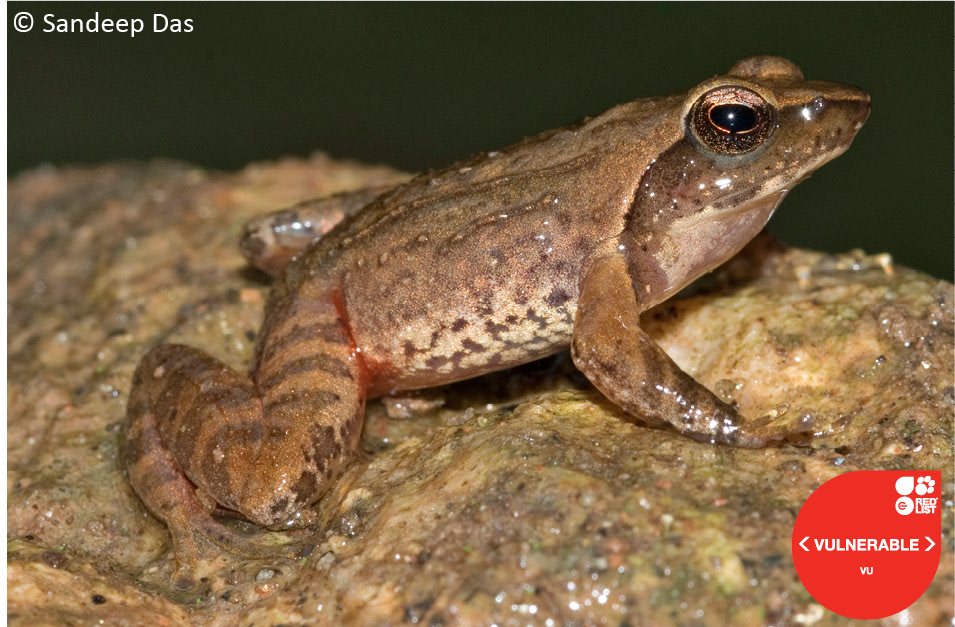
Lateral view

===== Micrixalus saxicola (Malabar torrent frog) =====
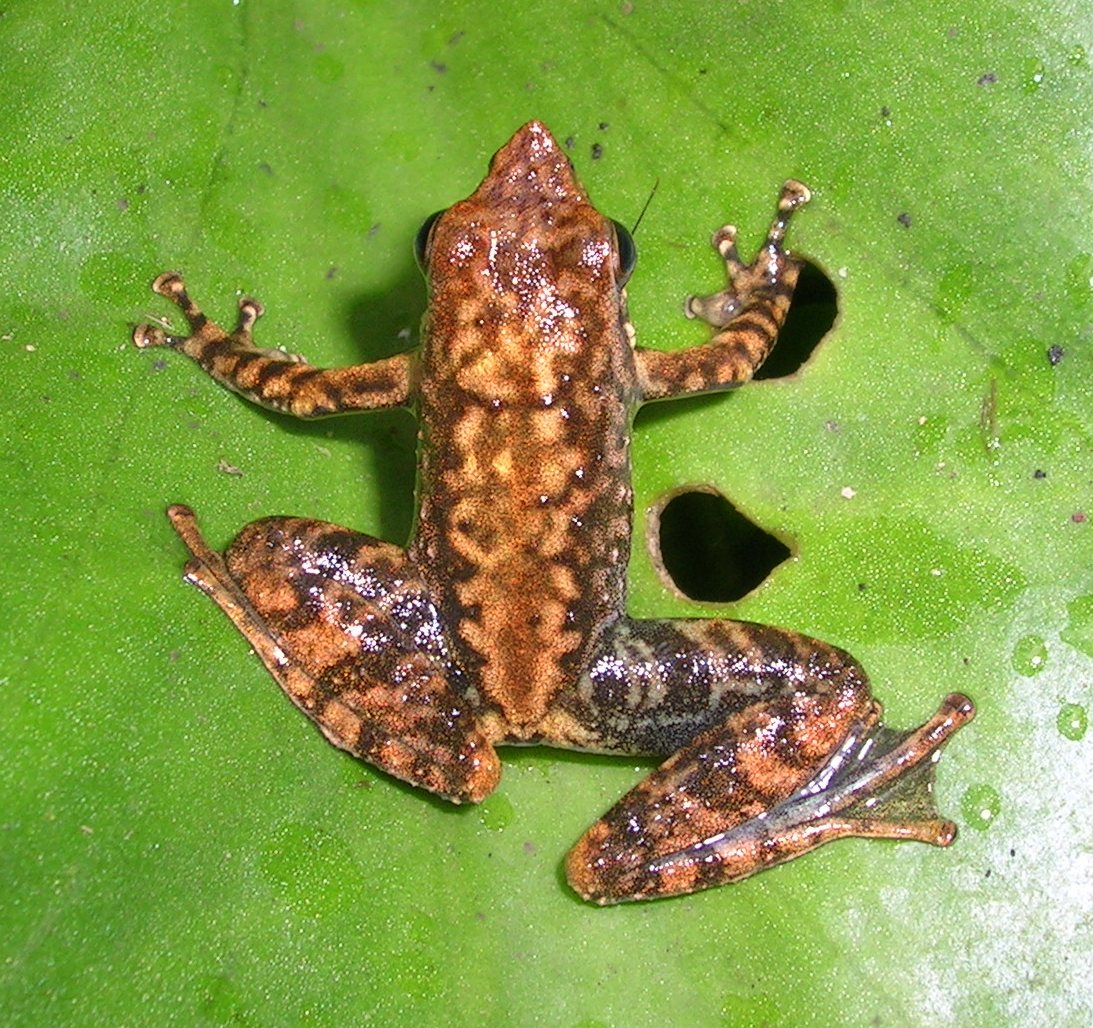
Dorsal view

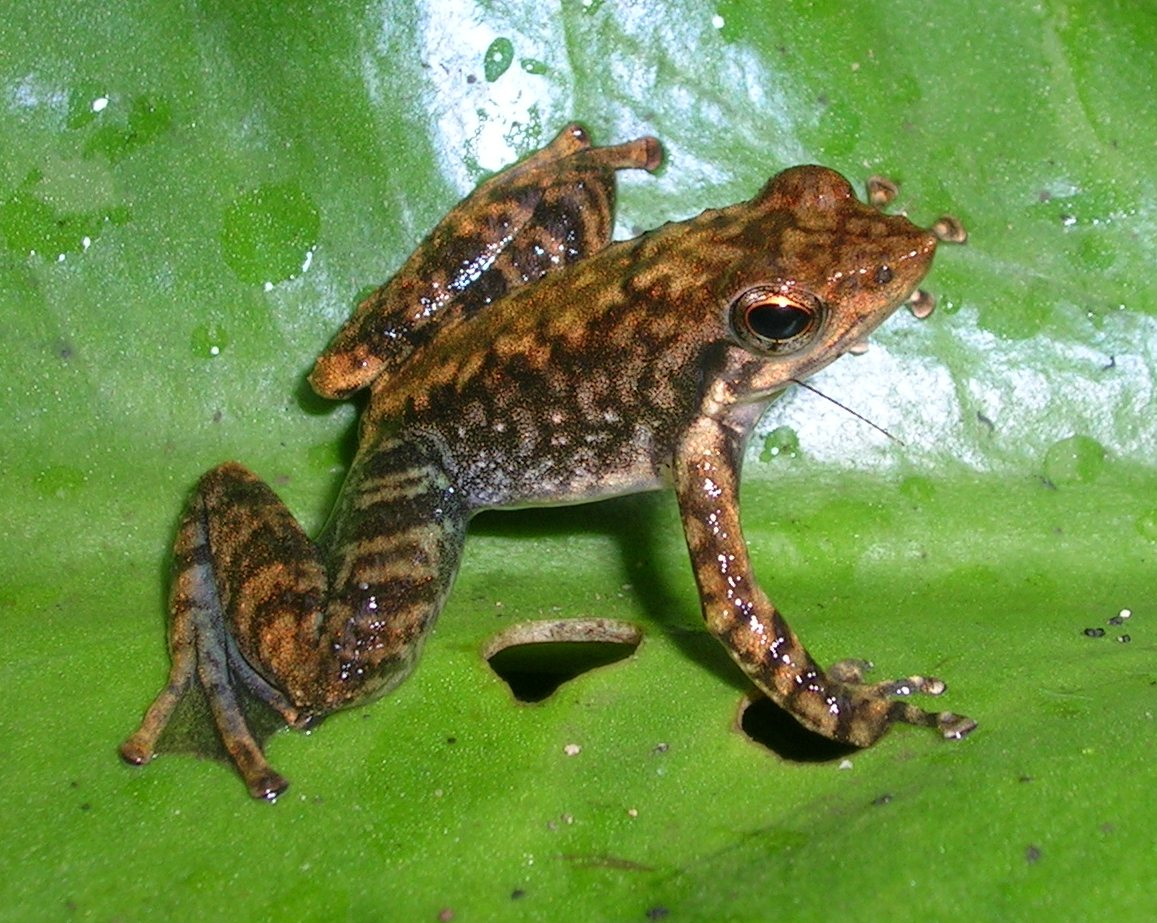
Lateral view

===== Micrixalus thampii (Thampi's torrent frog) =====
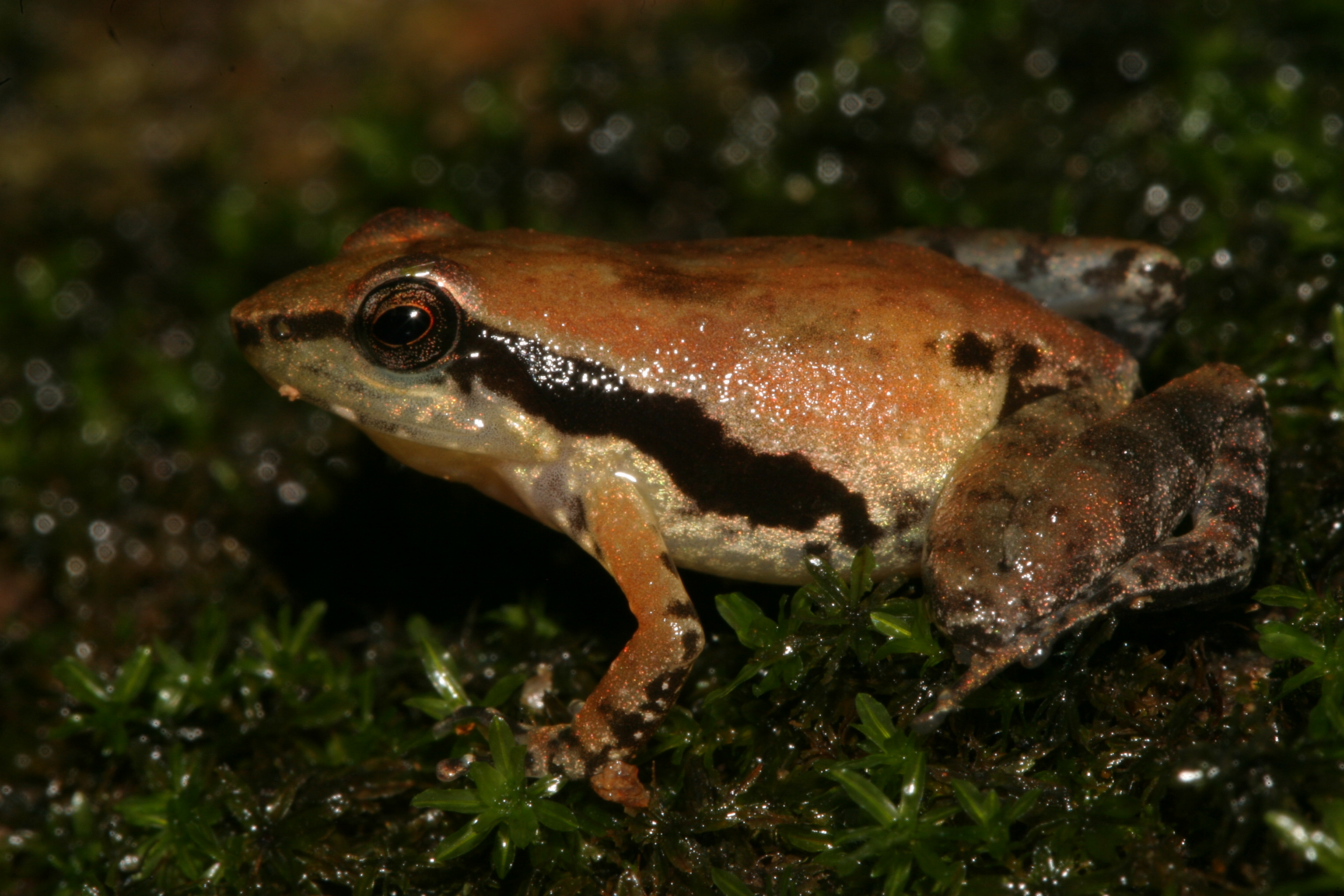
Lateral view

=== Family: Microhylidae (narrow-mouthed frogs) ===
==== Genus: Melanobatrachus ====
===== Melanobatrachus indicus (black microhylid frog) =====
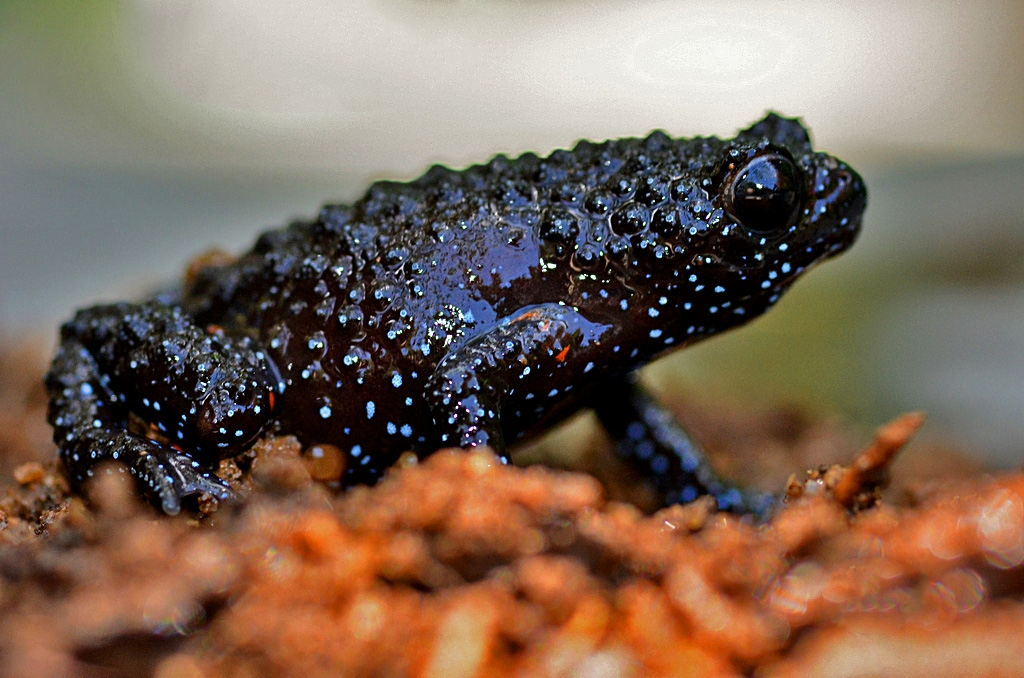
Lateral view

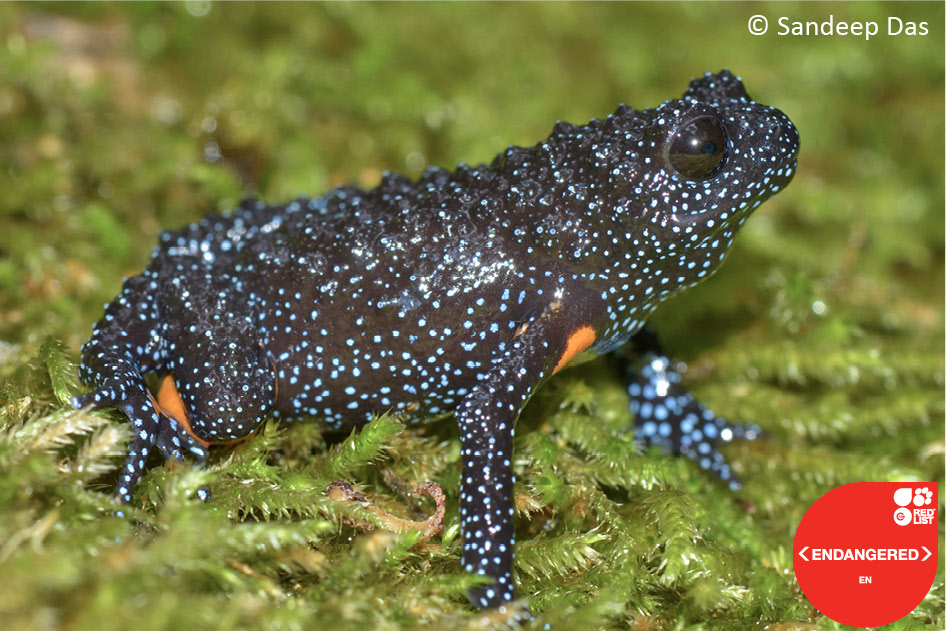
Lateral view

==== Genus: Microhyla ====
===== Microhyla ornata (ornate narrow-mouthed frog) =====
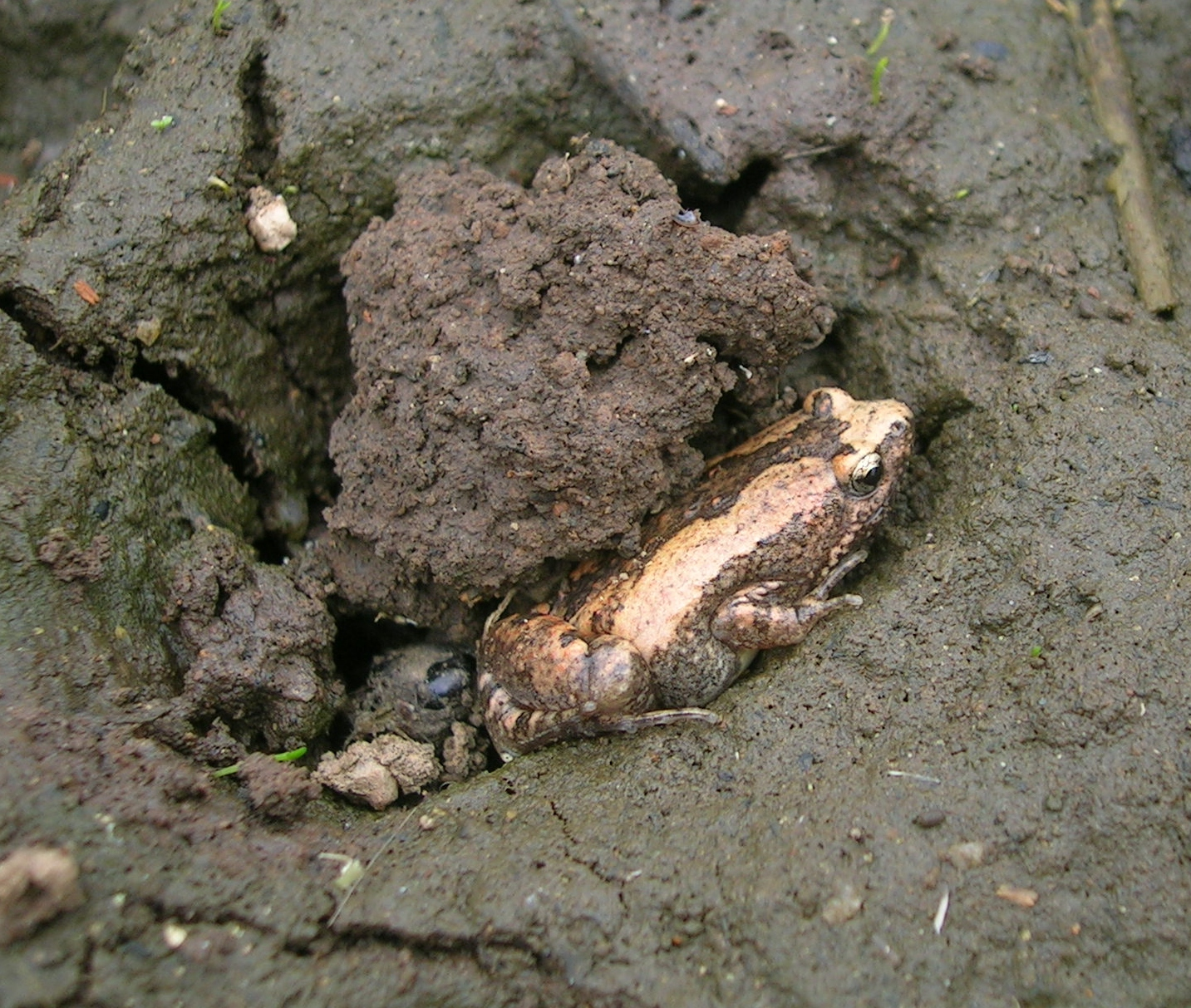
Lateral view

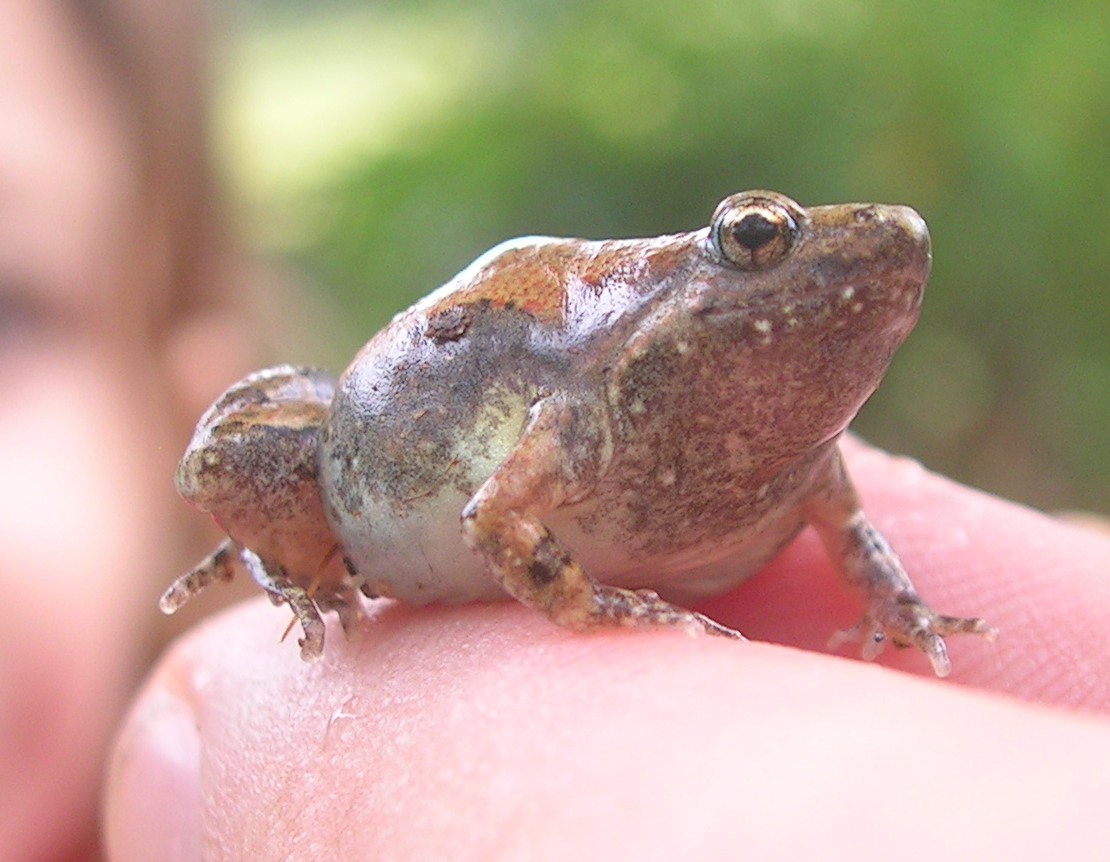
Lateral view

===== Microhyla rubra (reddish narrow-mouthed frog) =====
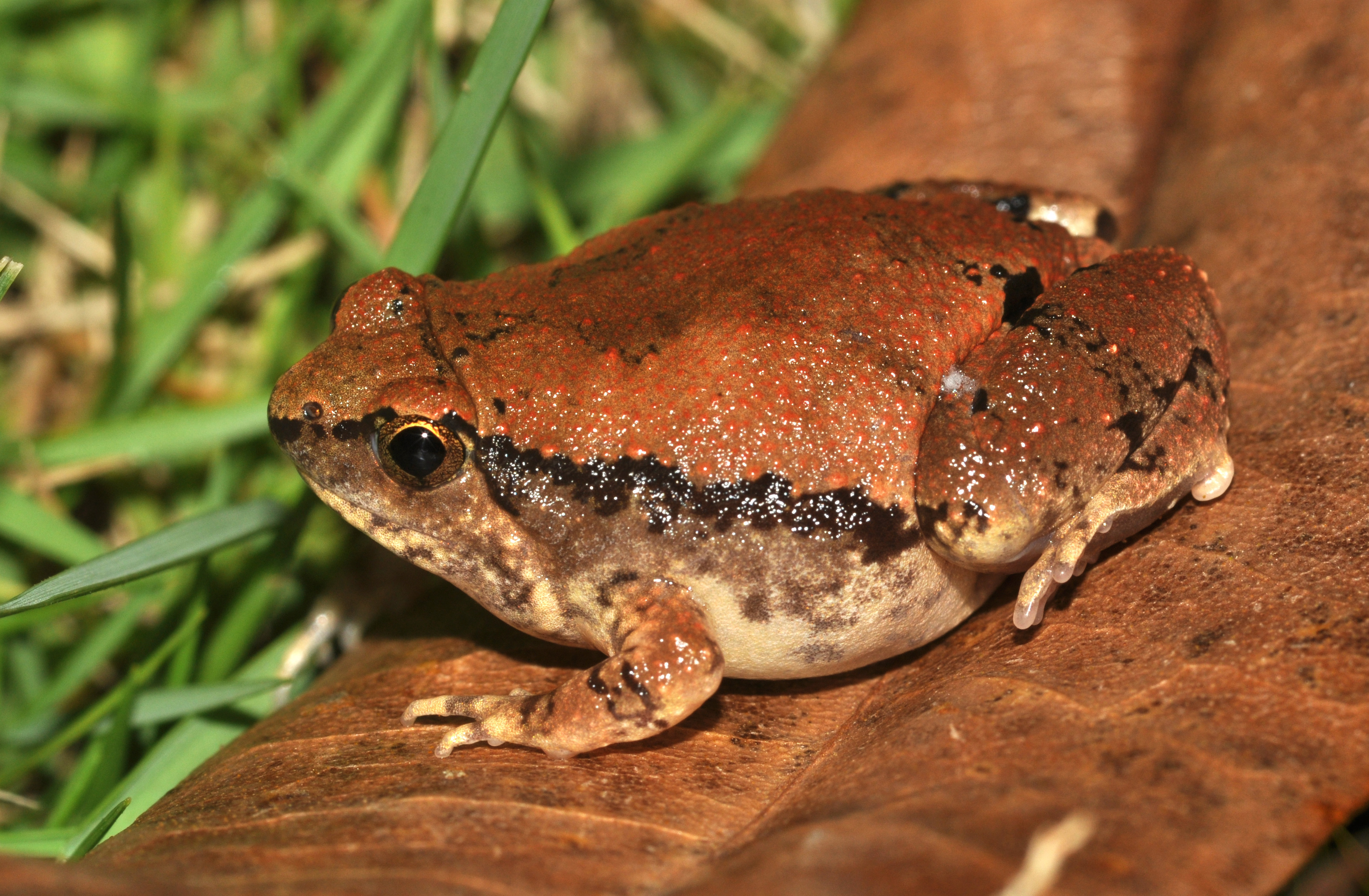
Lateral view

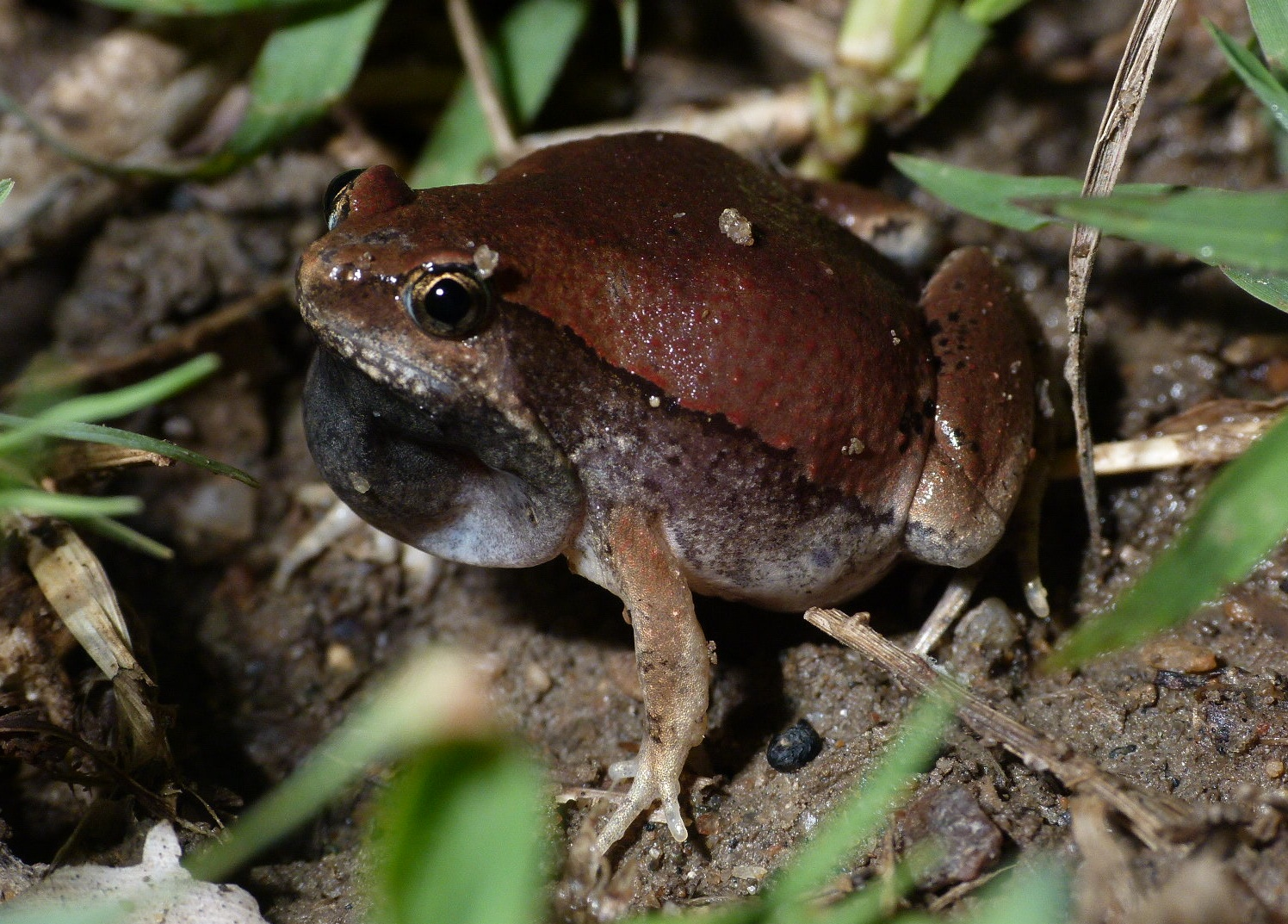
Lateral view

===== Microhyla sholigari (Sholigari Microhylid frog) =====
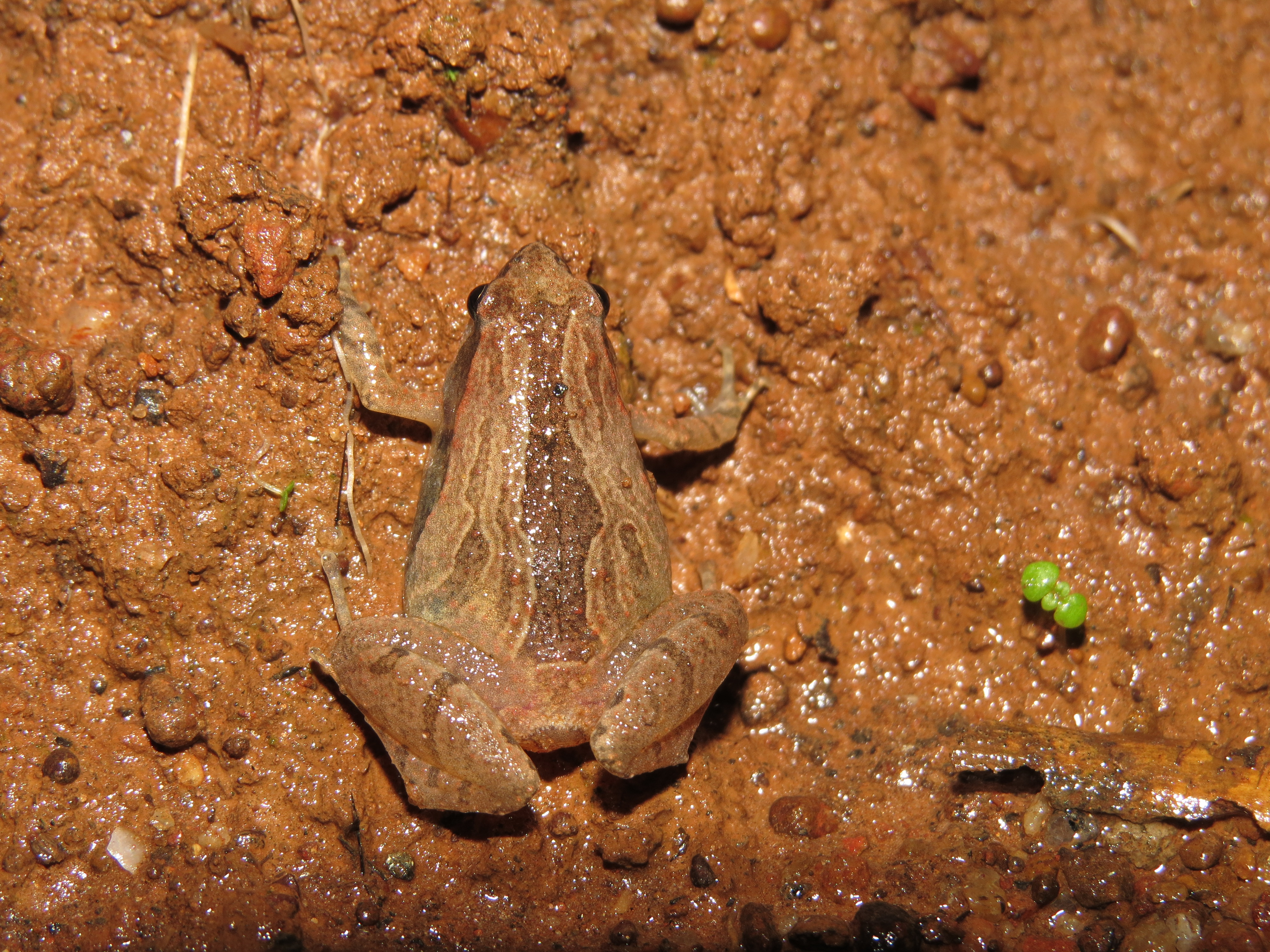
Dorsal view

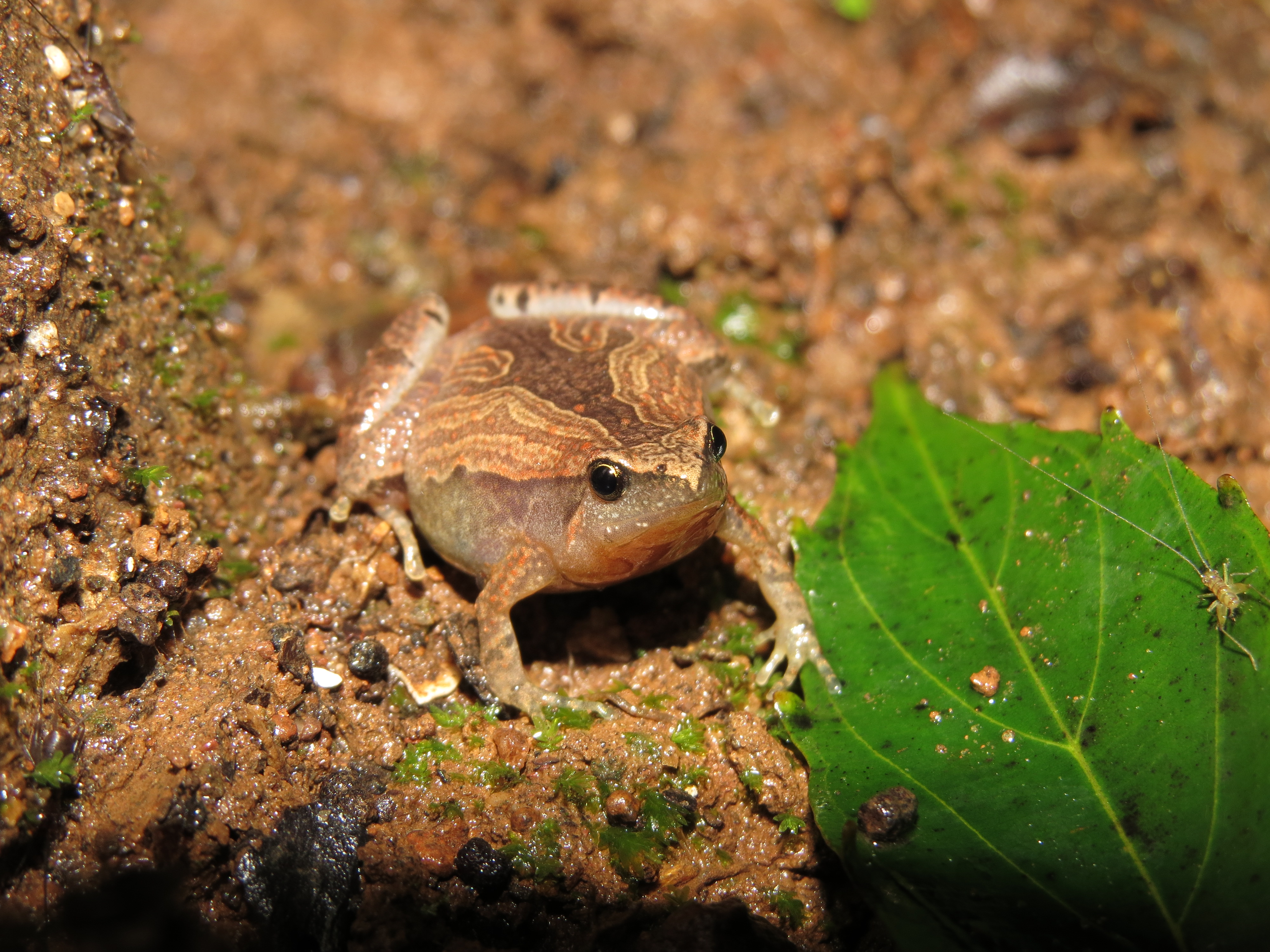
Front view

==== Genus: Mysticellus ====
===== Mysticellus franki (Franky's narrow-mouthed frog) =====
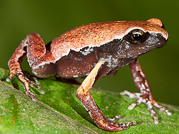

==== Genus: Uperodon ====
===== Uperodon anamalaiensis (Anamalai dot/balloon frog) =====
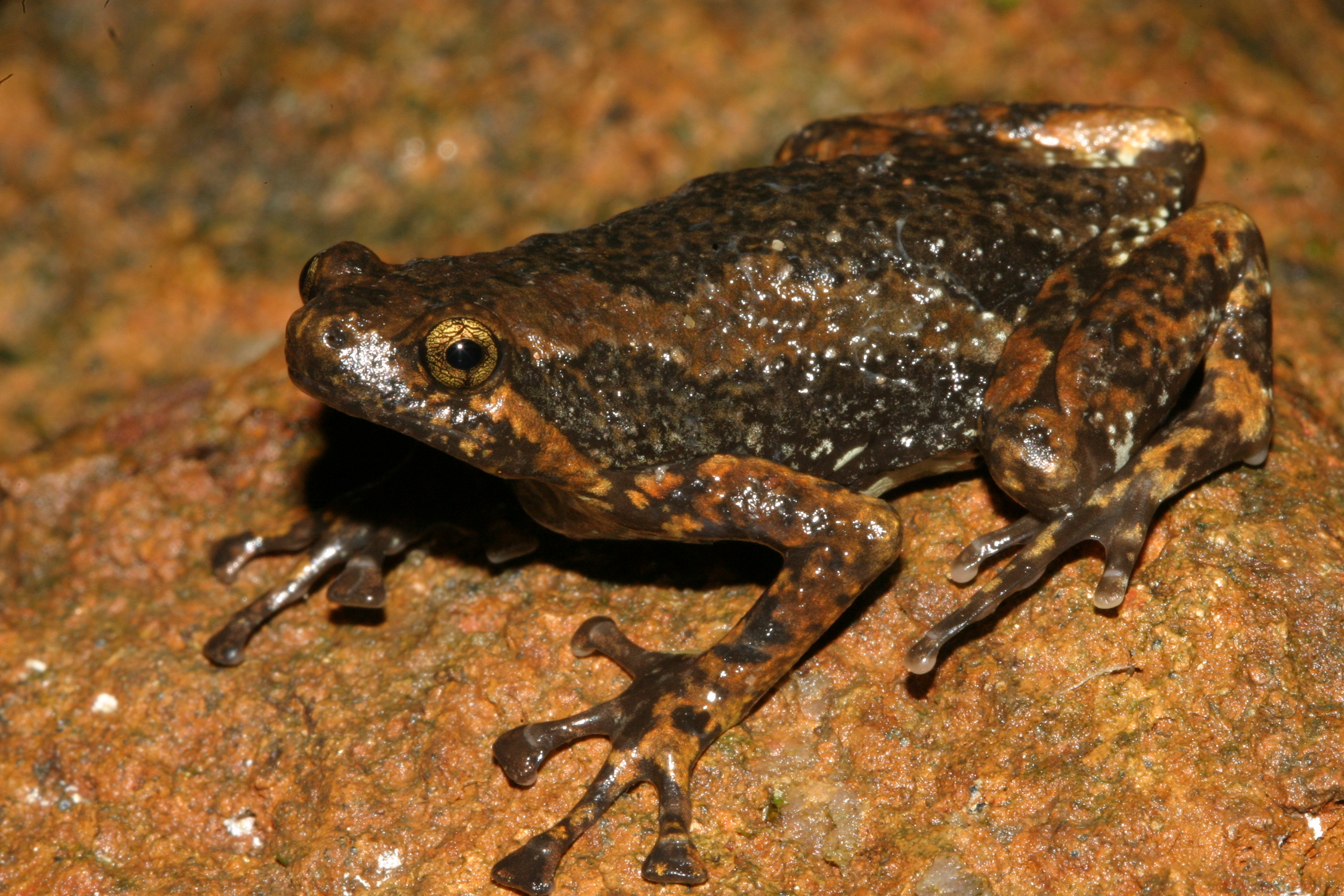
Lateral view

===== Uperodon globulosus (Indian balloon frog) =====
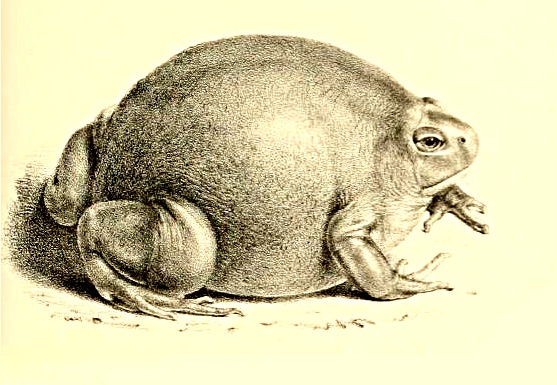
Illustration

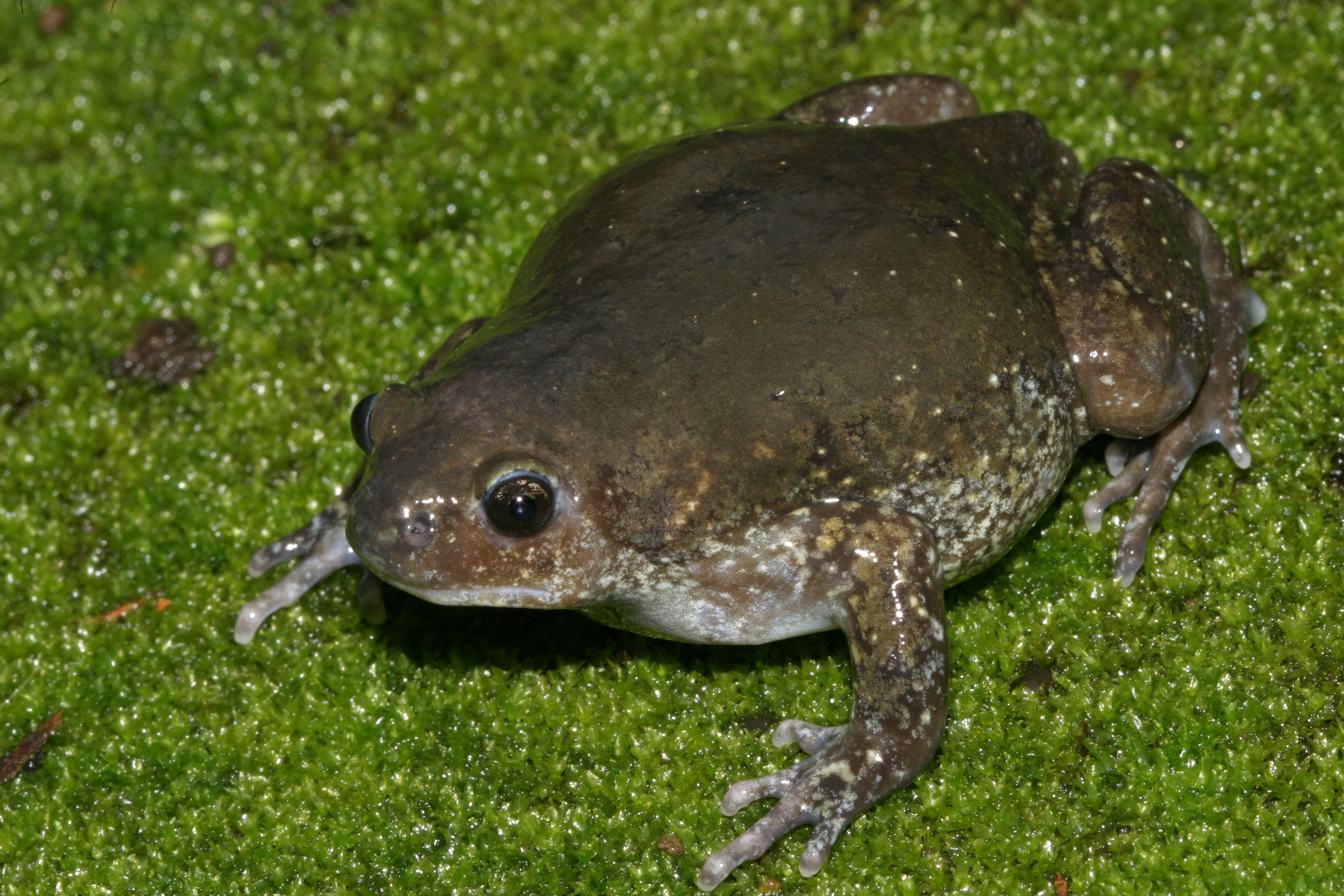
Lateral view

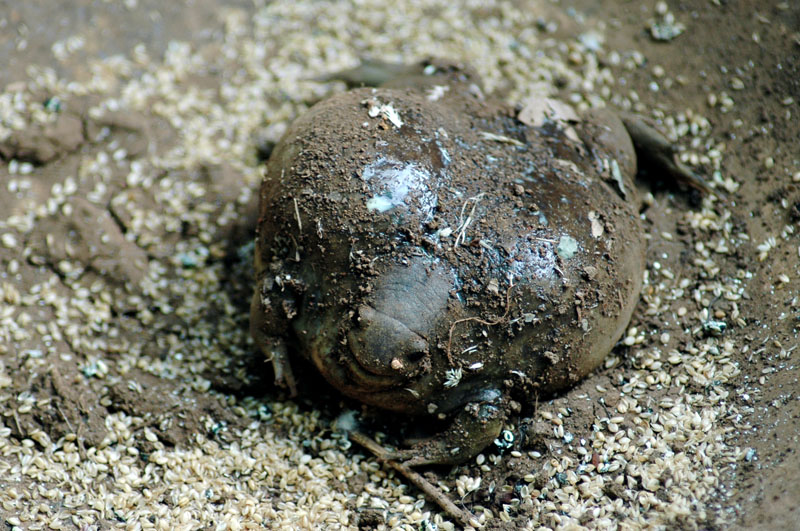
Front view

===== Uperodon montanus (Jerdon's balloon frog) =====
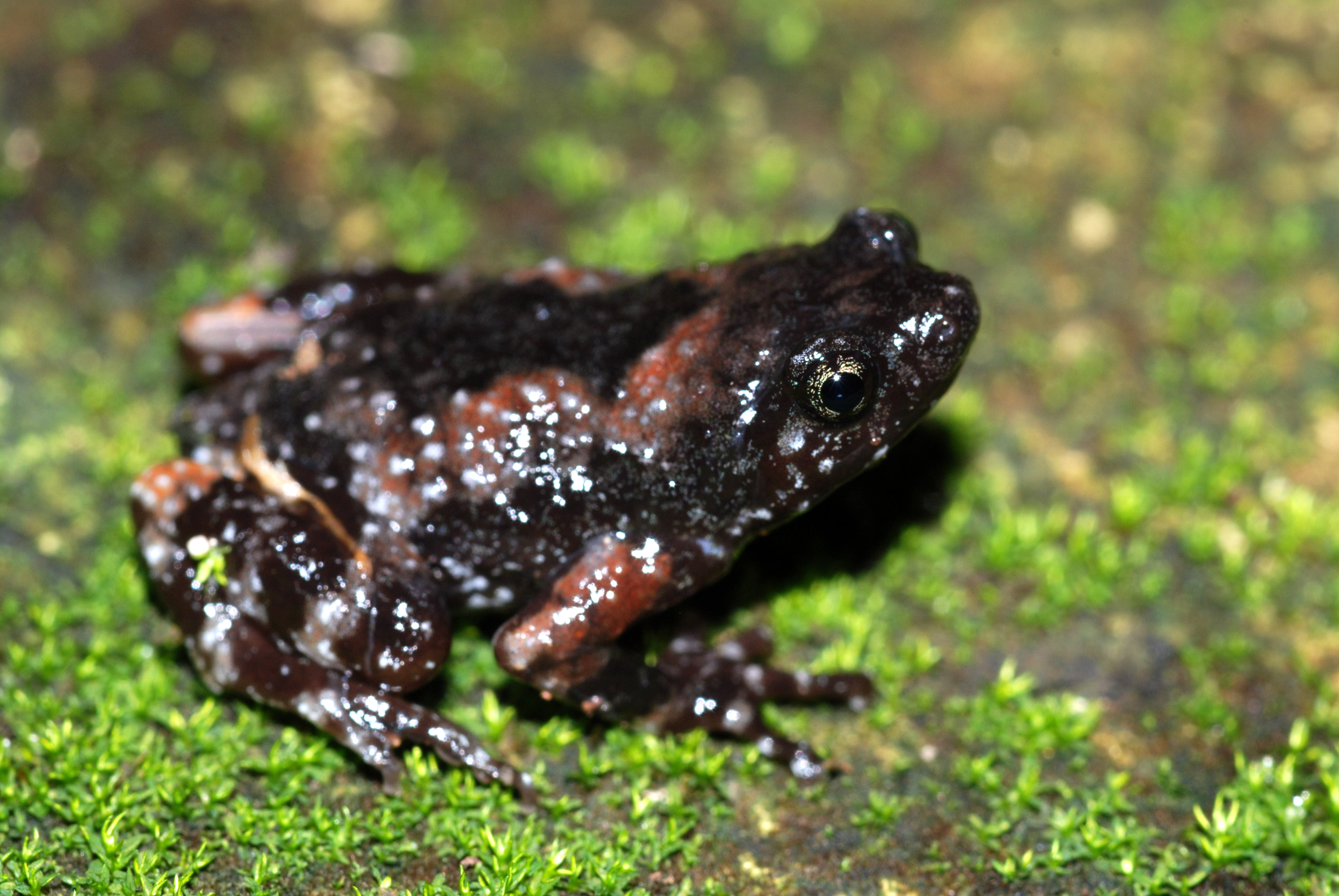
Lateral view

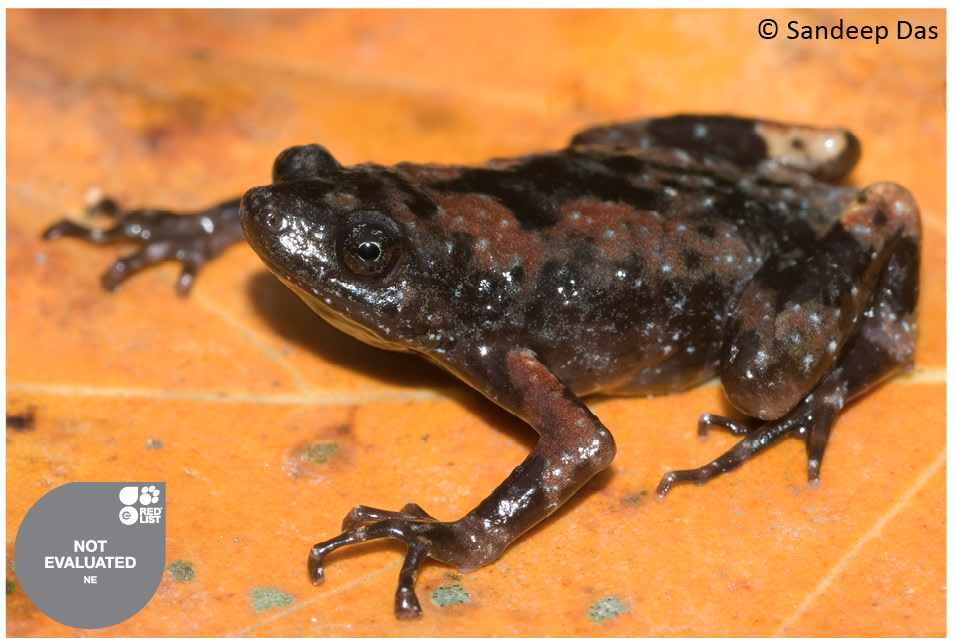
Lateral view

===== Uperodon systoma (marbled balloon frog) =====
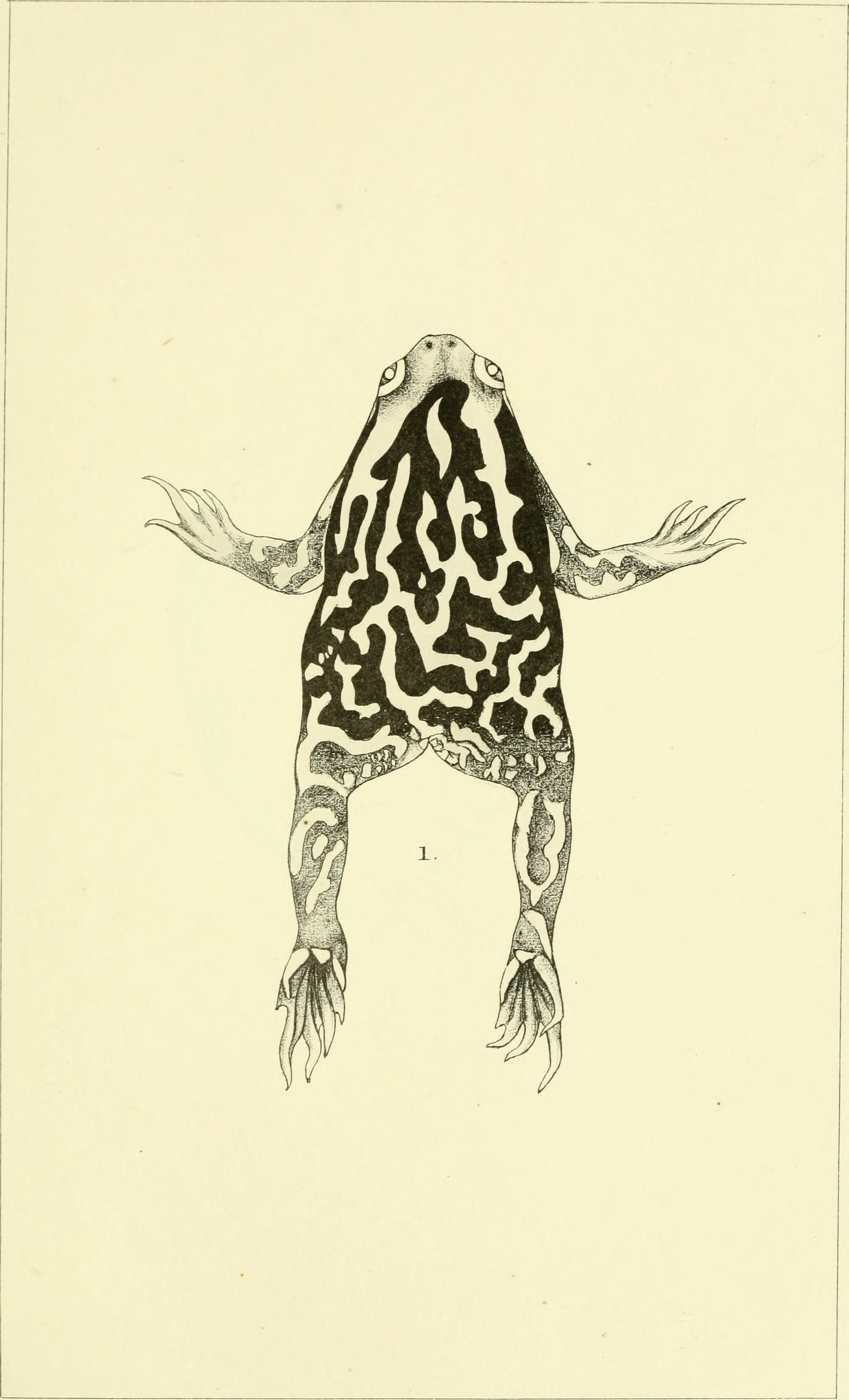
Illustration

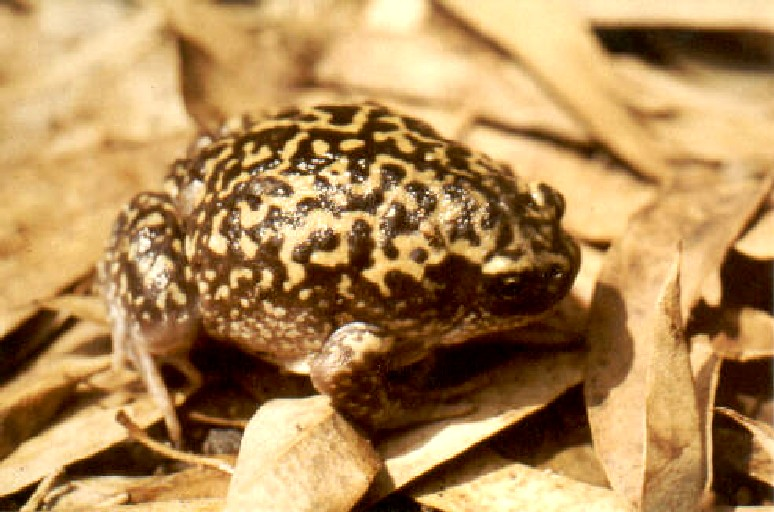
Lateral view

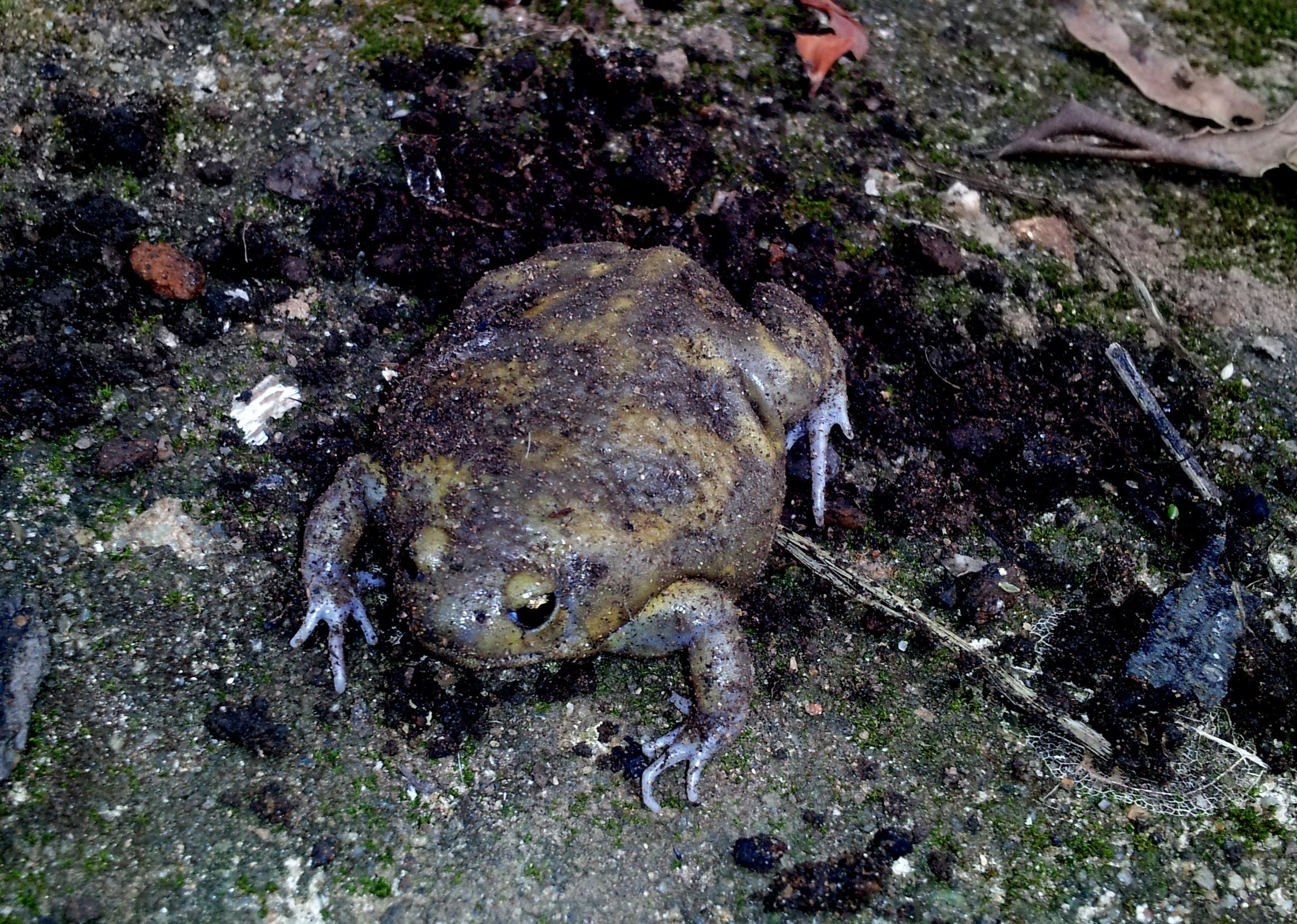
Front view

===== Uperodon taprobanica (painted frog) =====
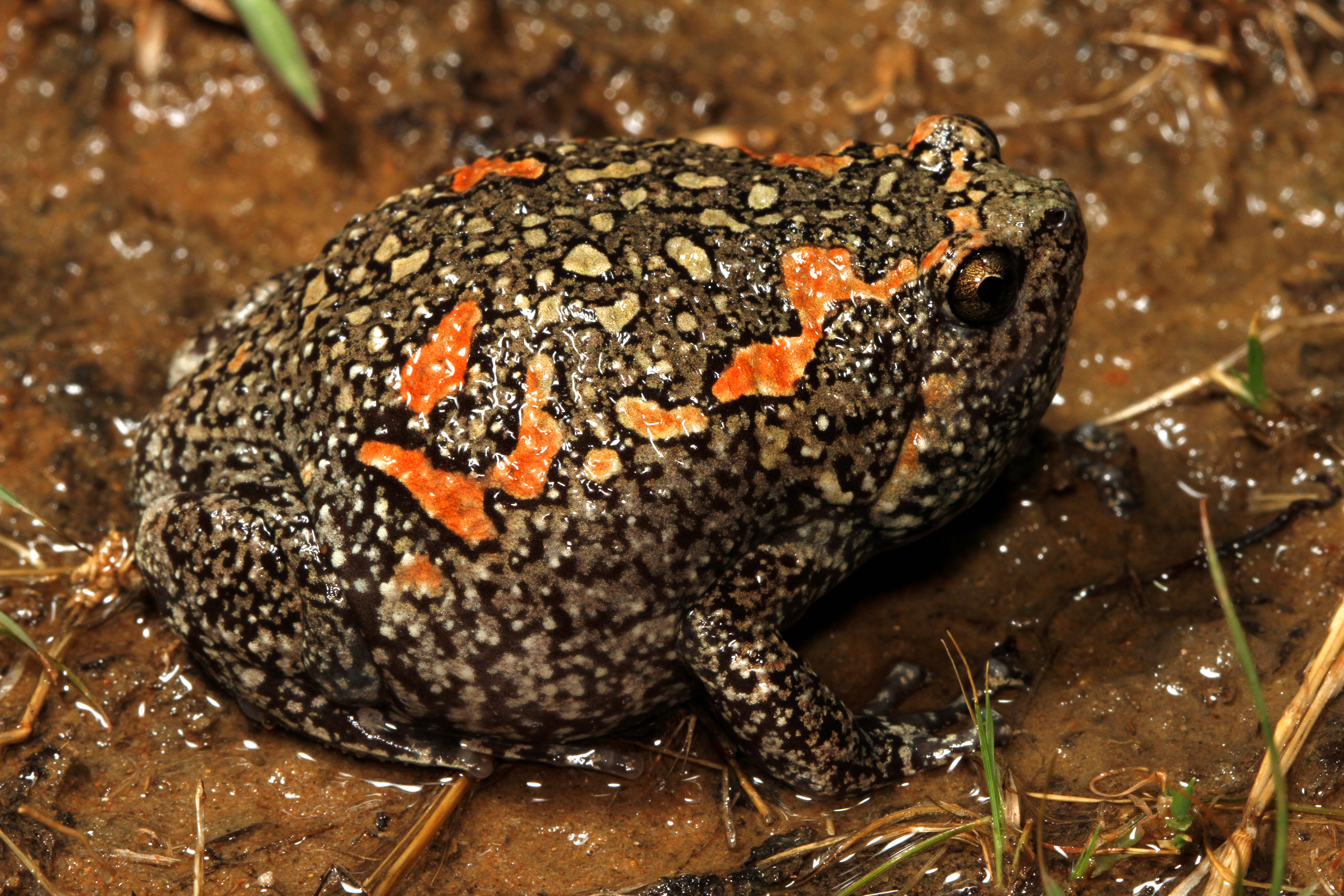
Lateral view

===== Uperodon triangularis (Malabar frog) =====
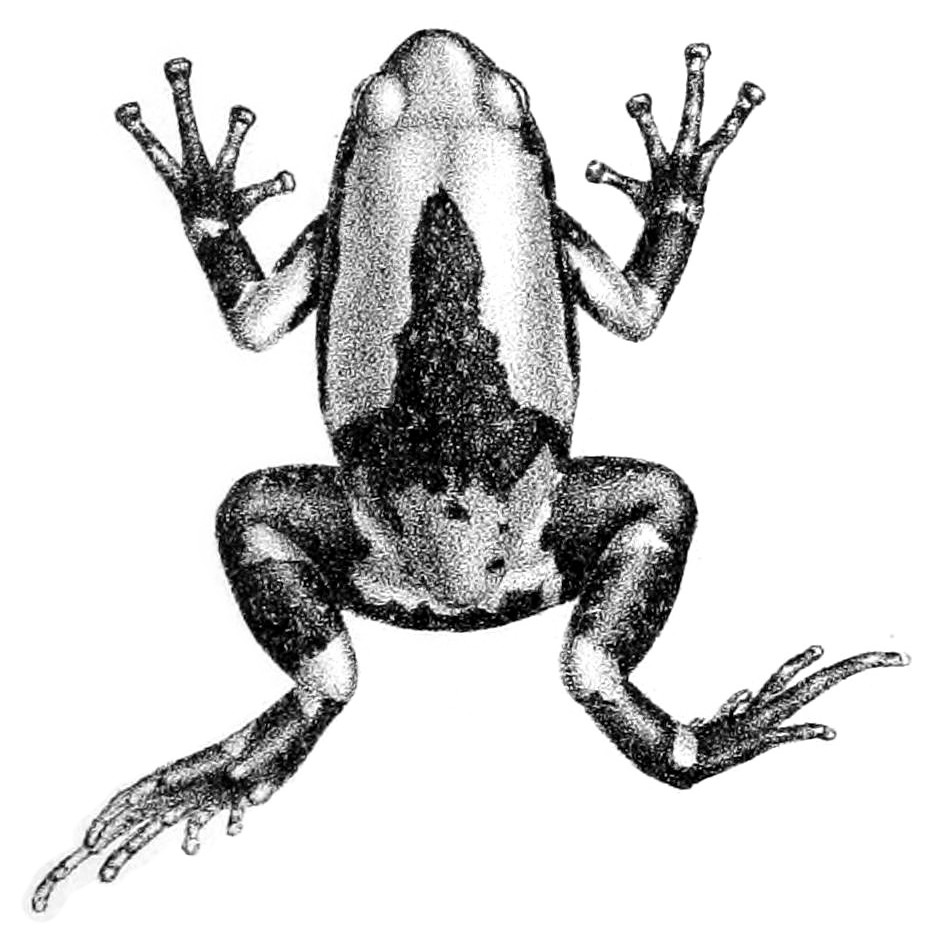
Illustration

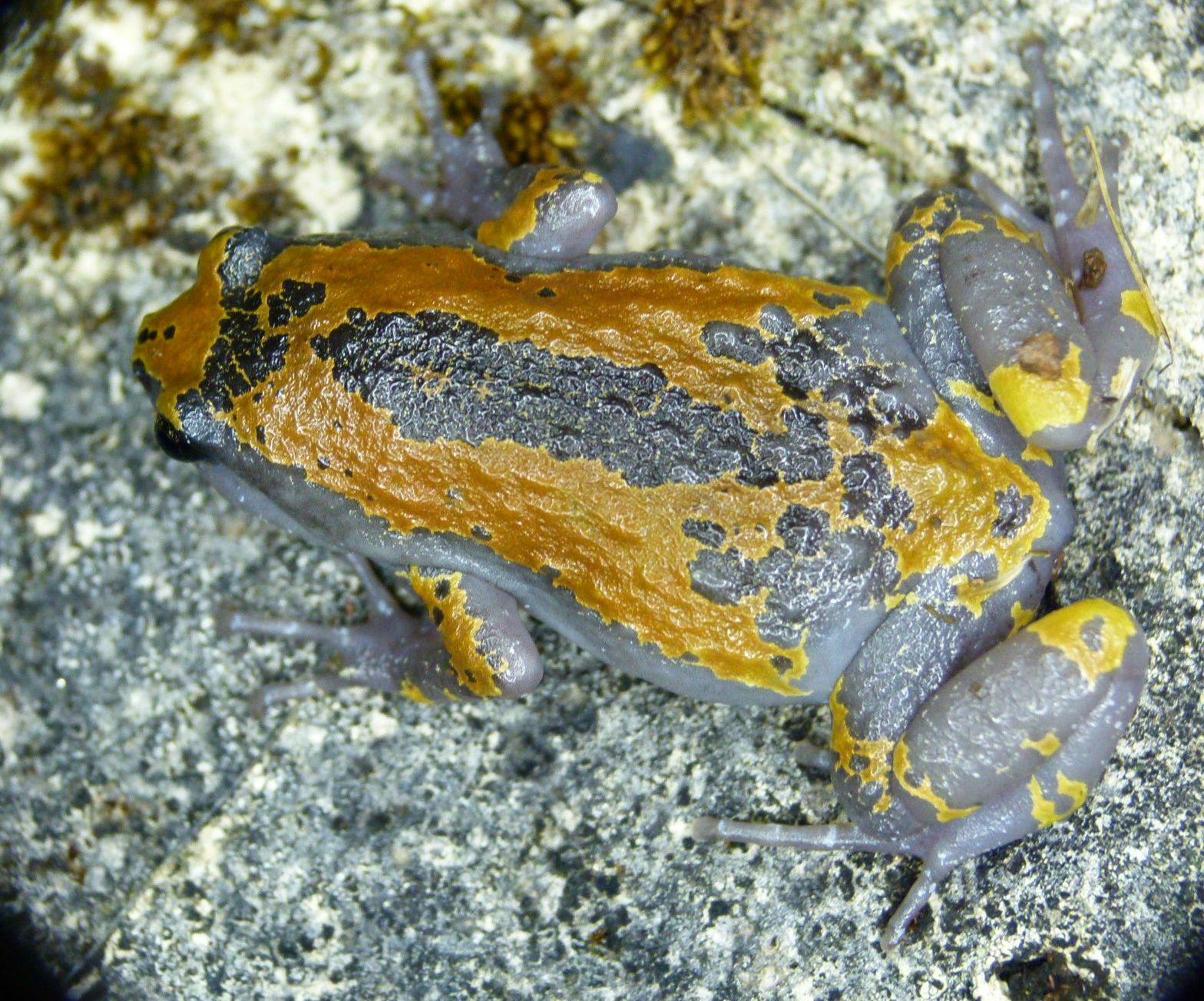
Dorsal view

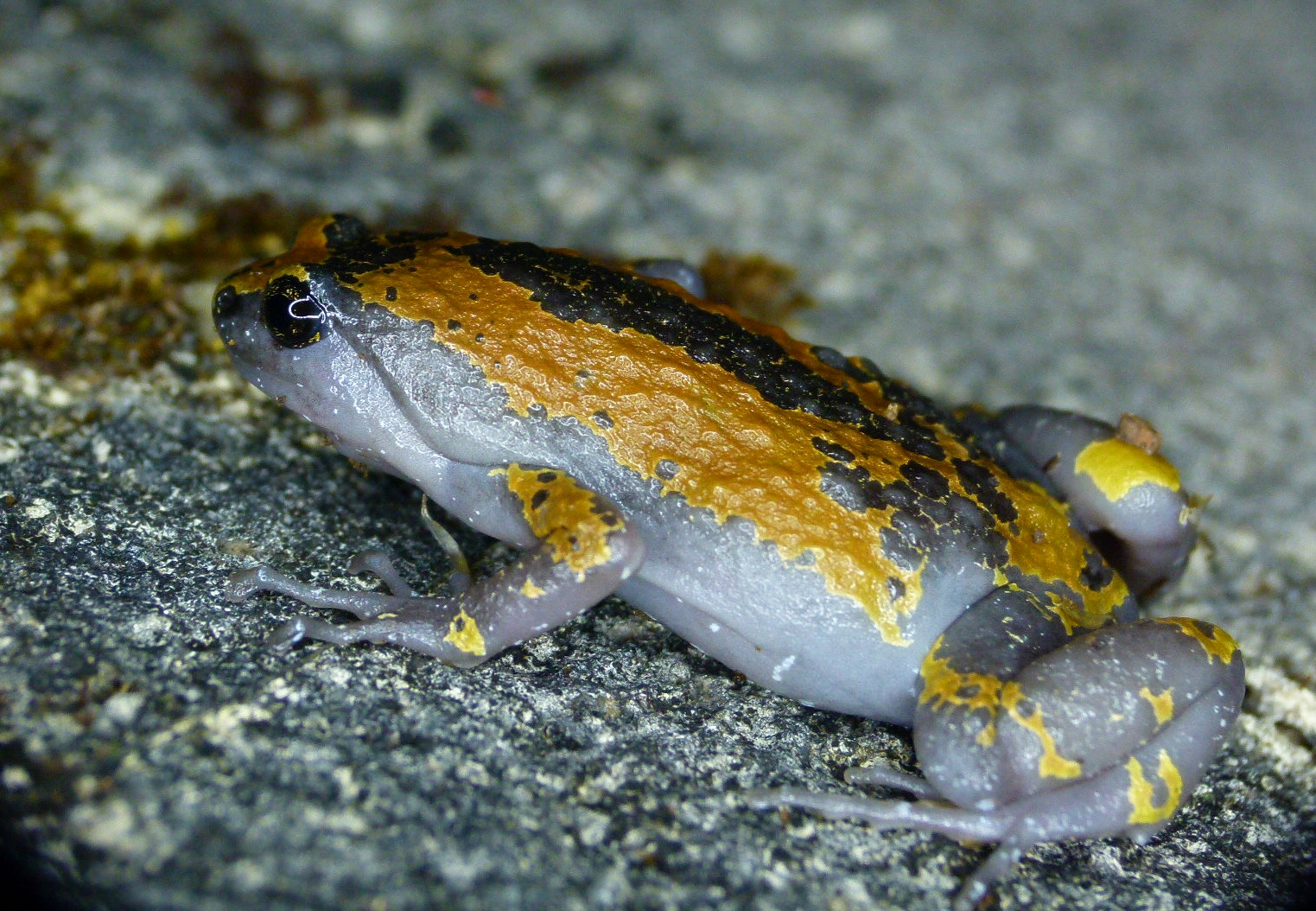
Lateral view

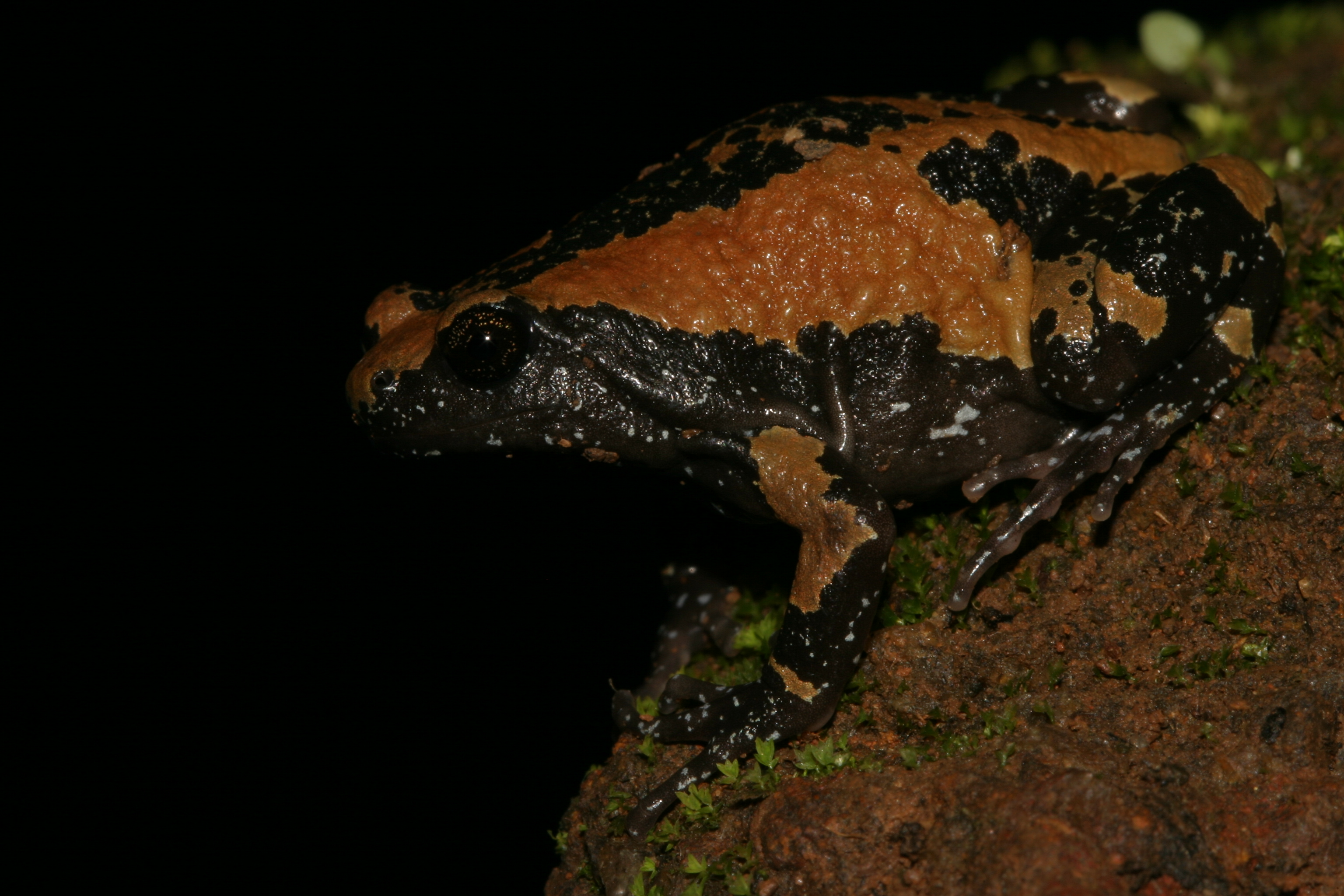
Lateral view

===== Uperodon variegata (variegated frog) =====
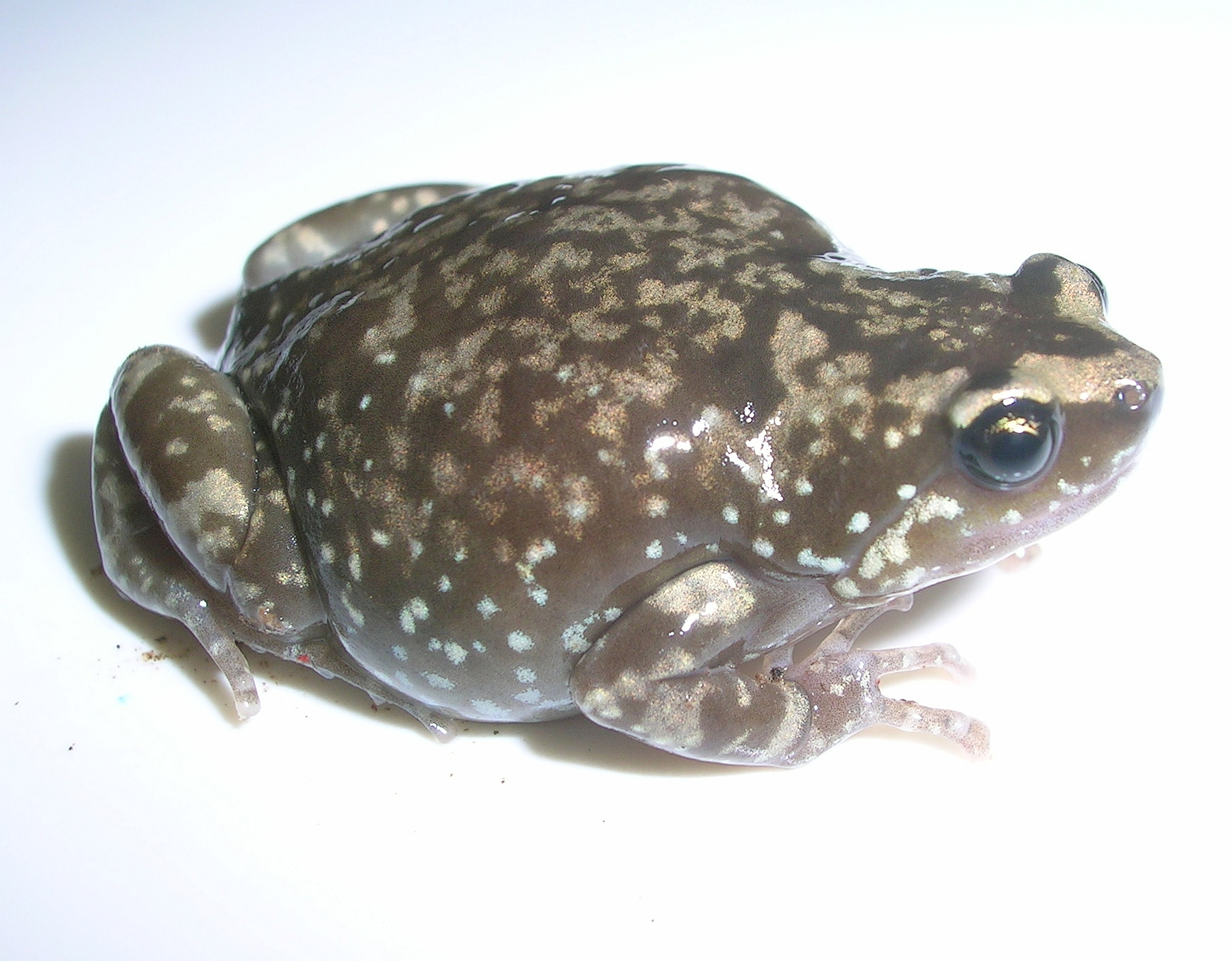
Dorsal view

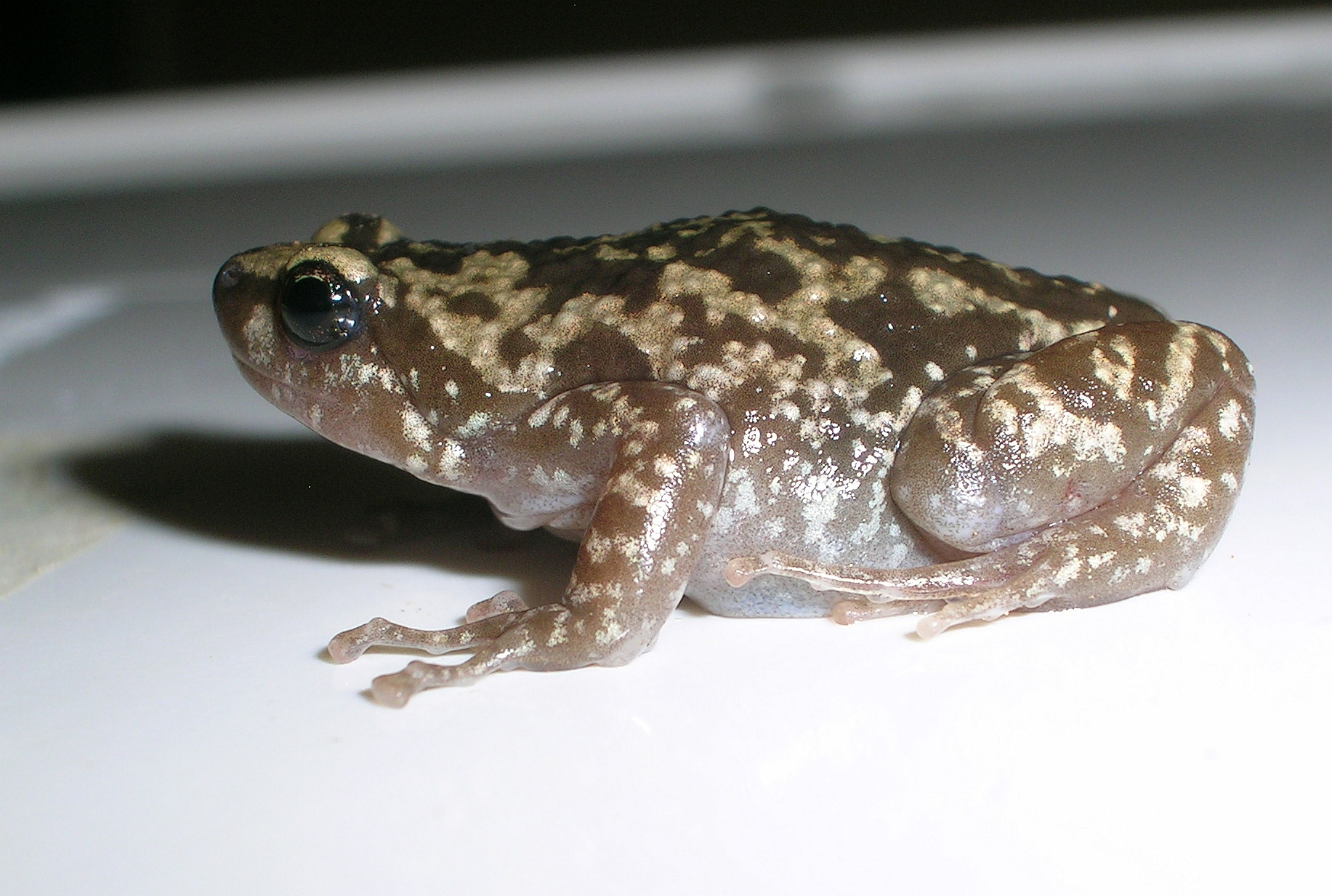
Lateral view

=== Family: Nasikabatrachidae (purple frogs) ===
==== Genus: Nasikabatrachus ====
===== Nasikabatrachus sahyadrensis (purple frog) =====
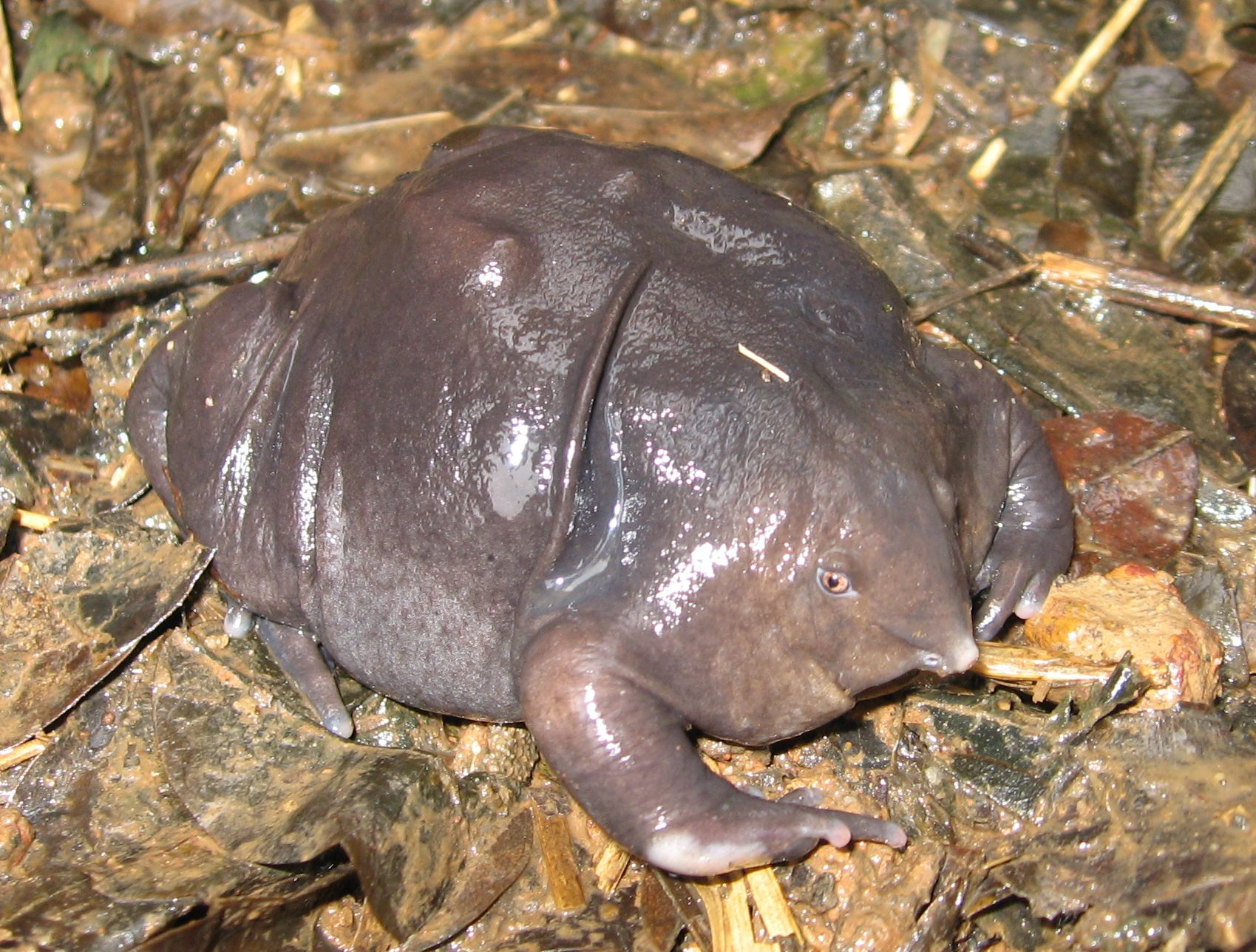
Lateral view

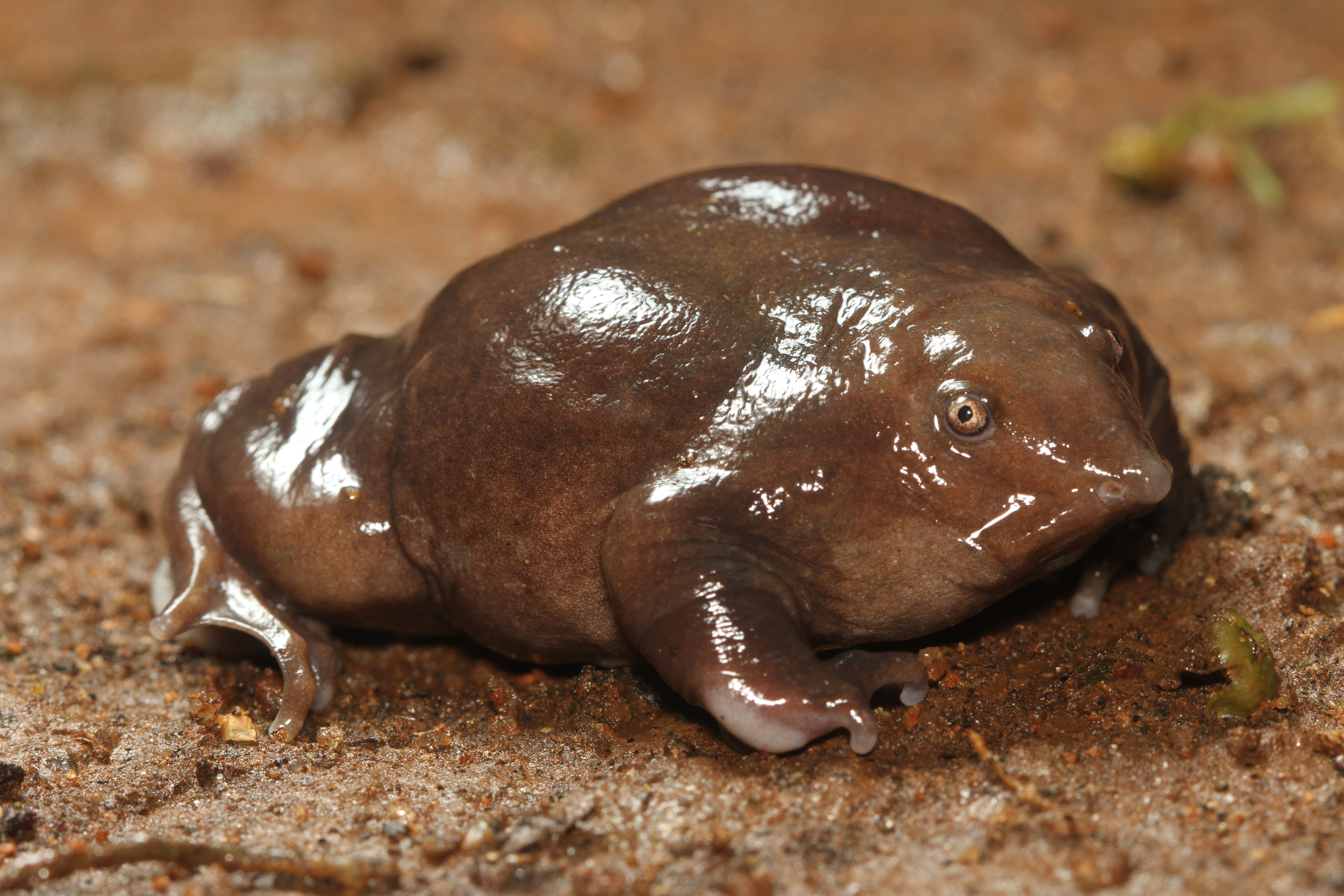
Lateral view

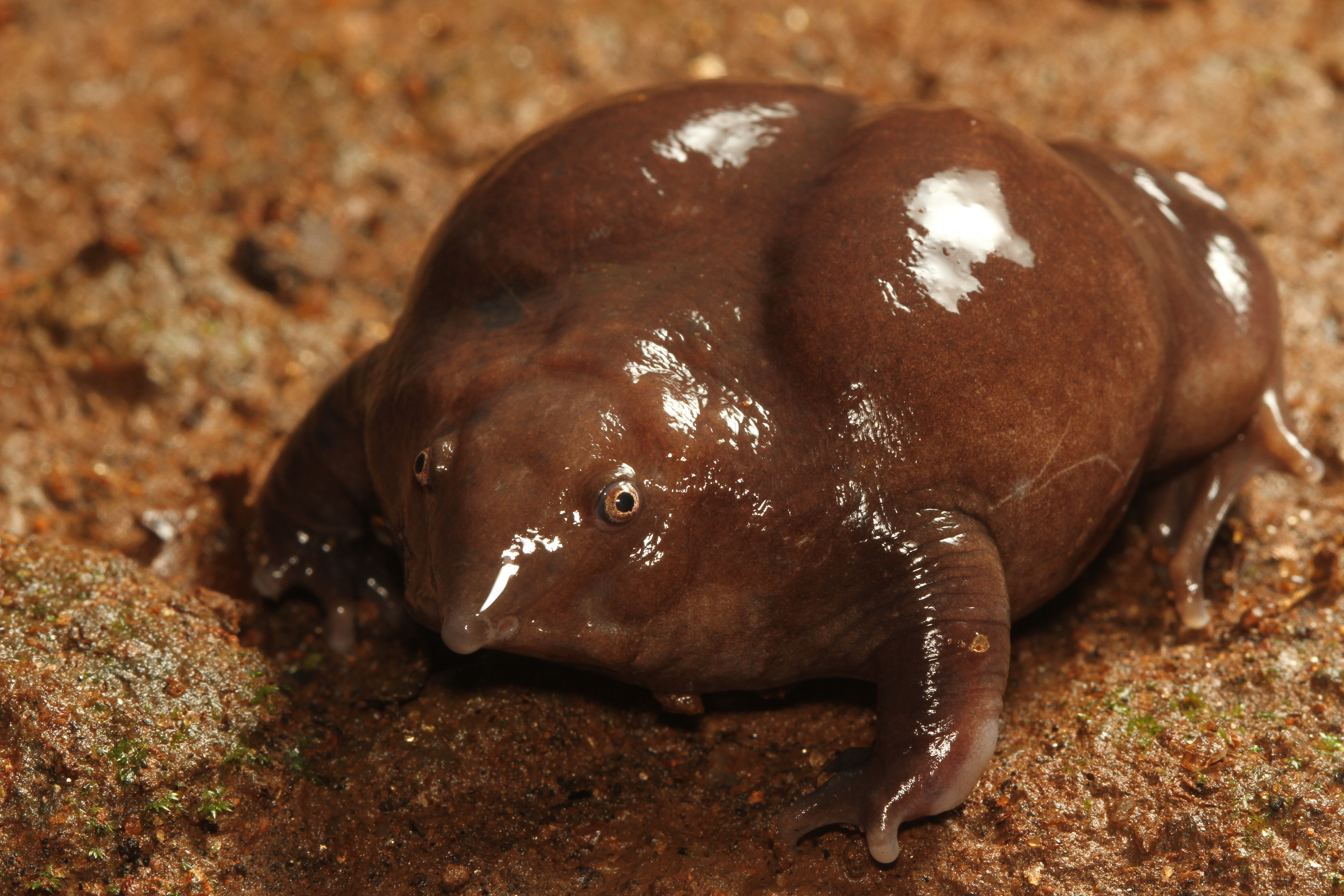
Front view

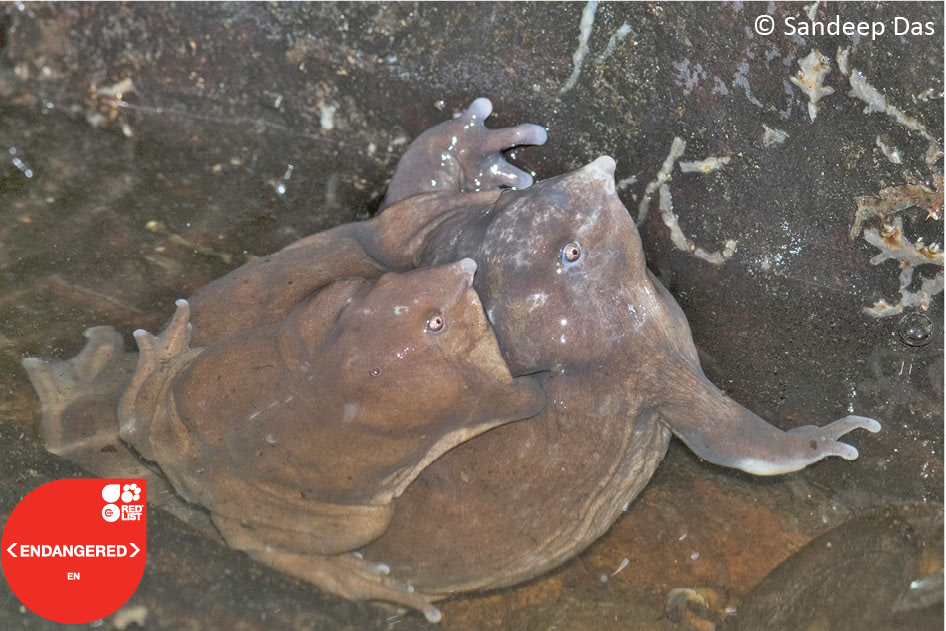
Mating

=== Family: Nyctibatrachidae (night frogs) ===
==== Genus: Nyctibatrachus ====
===== Nyctibatrachus beddomii (Beddome's night frog) =====
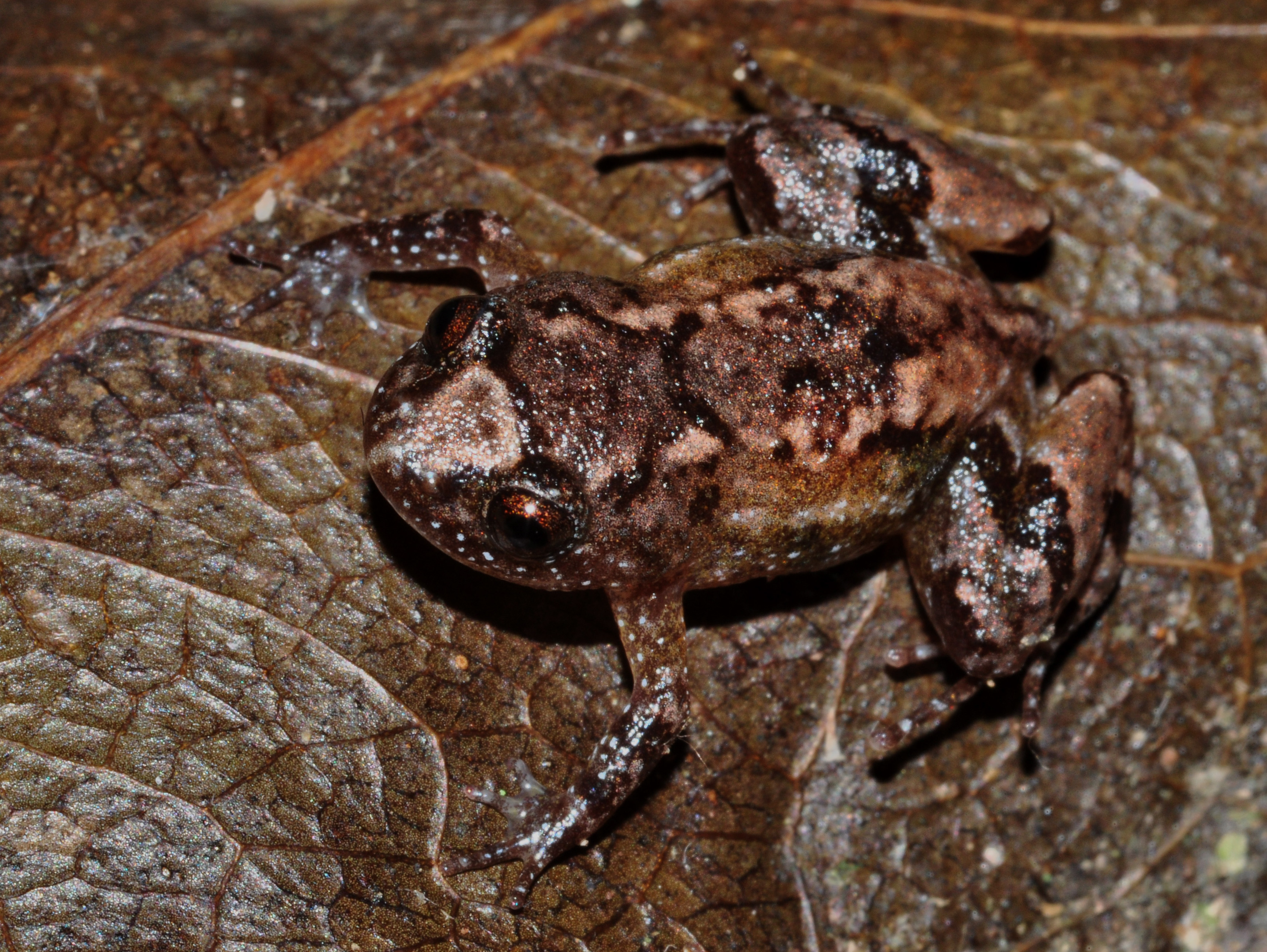
Lateral view

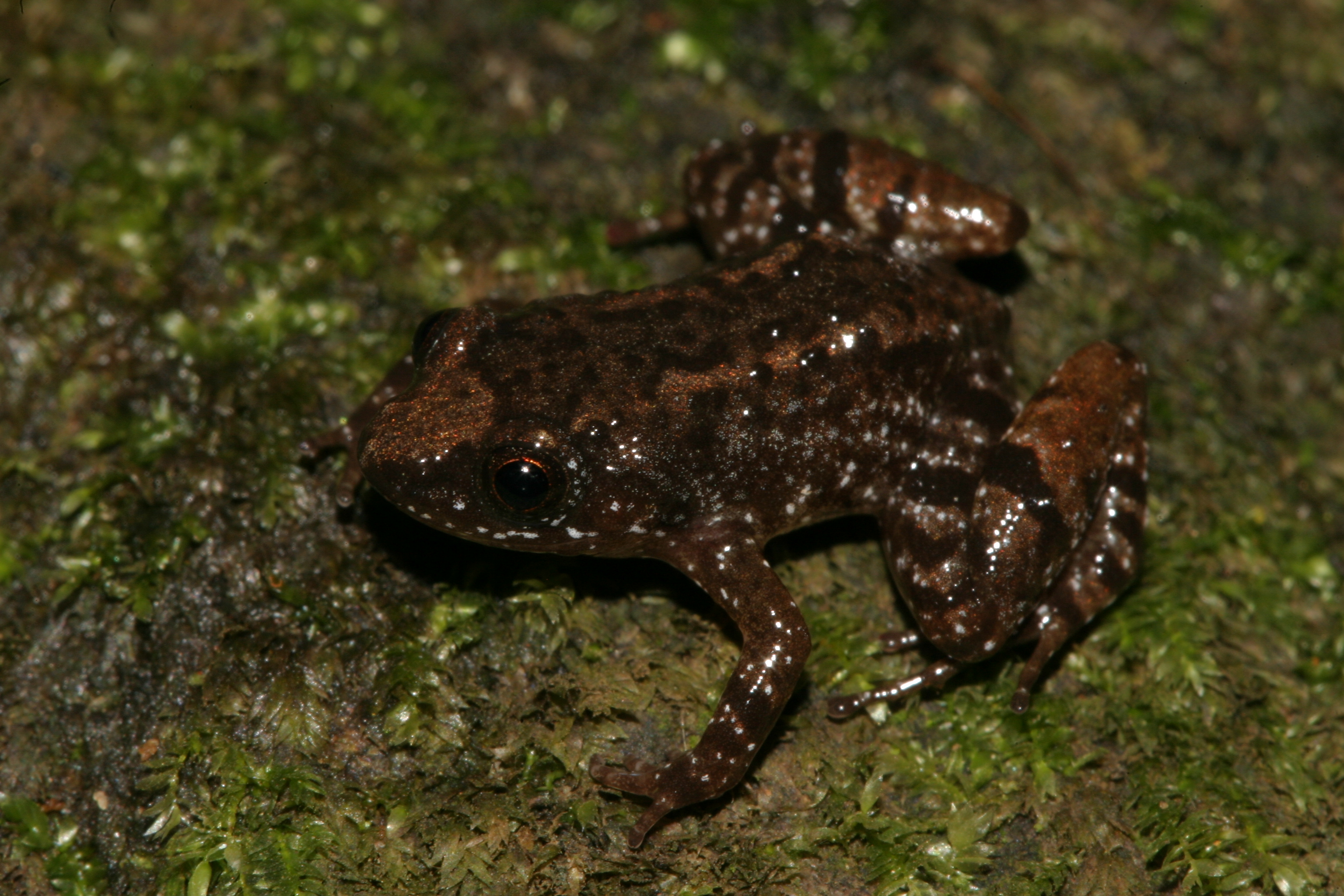
Lateral view

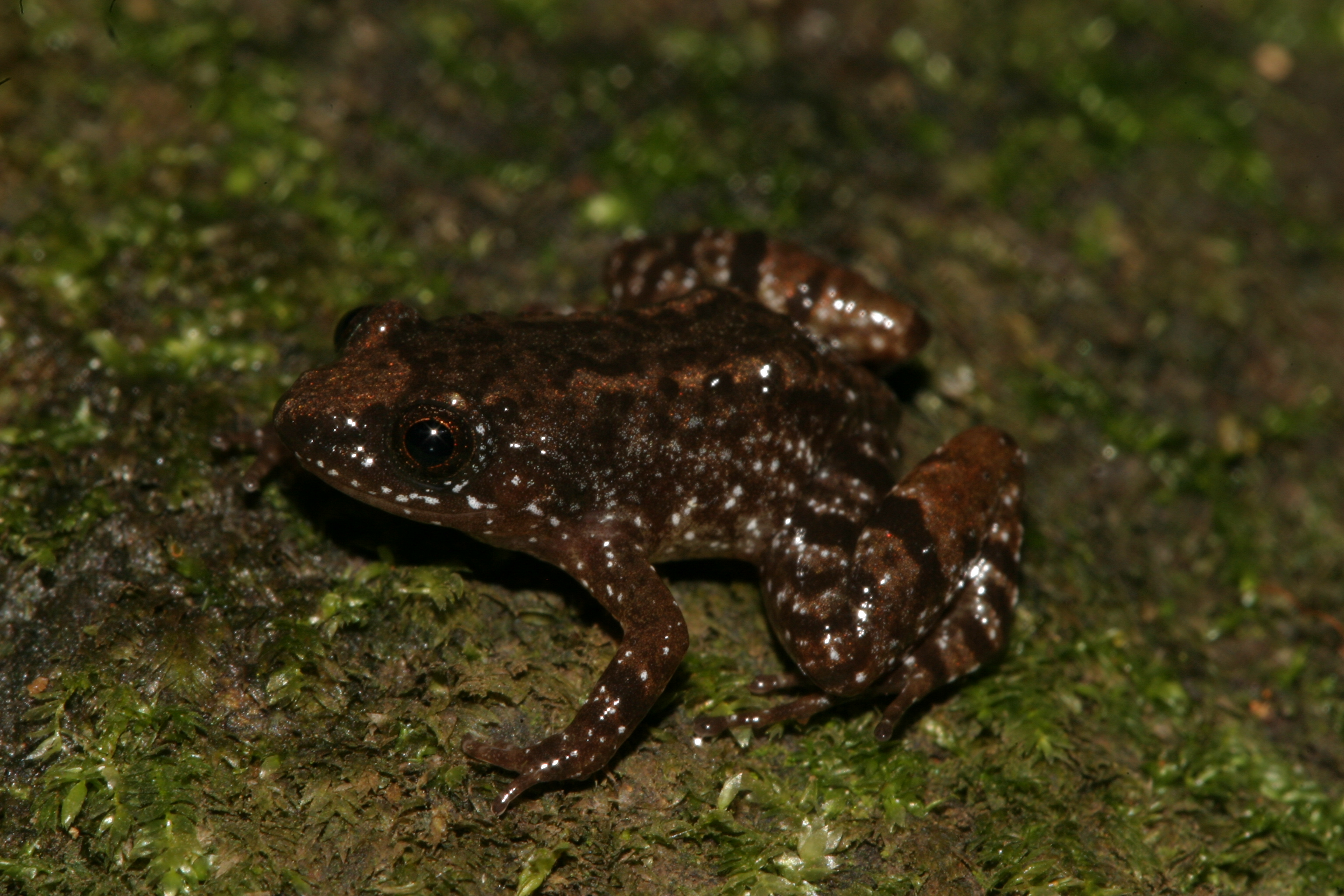
Lateral view

===== Nyctibatrachus deccanensis (Deccan night frog) =====
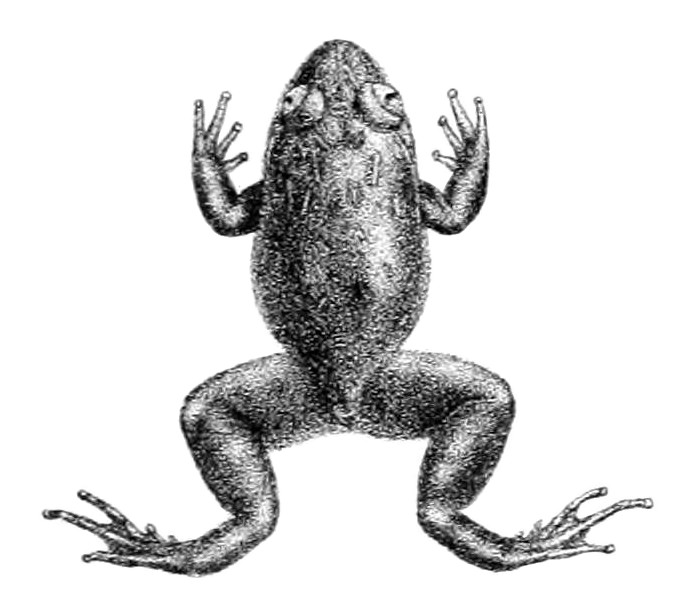
Illustration

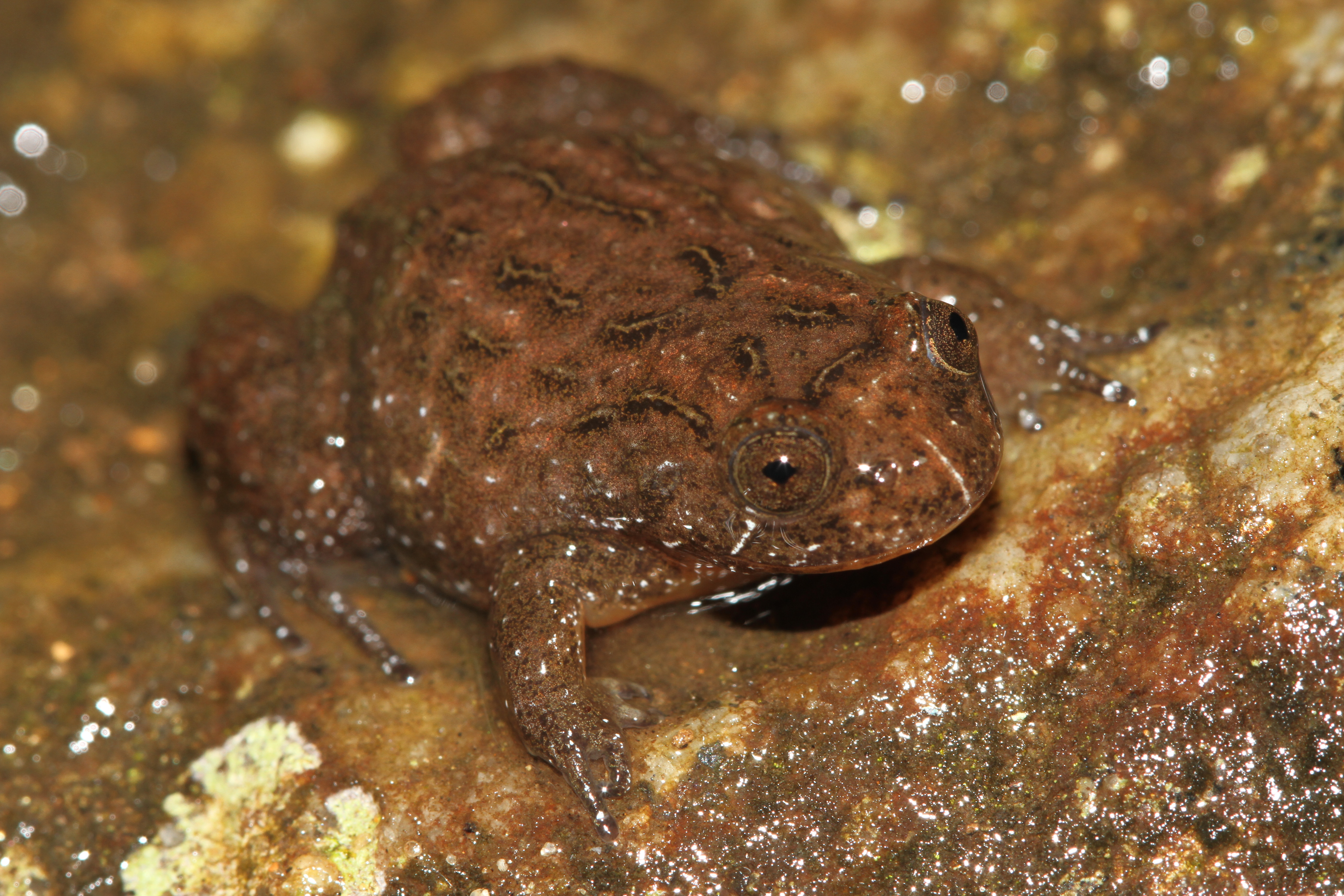
Lateral view

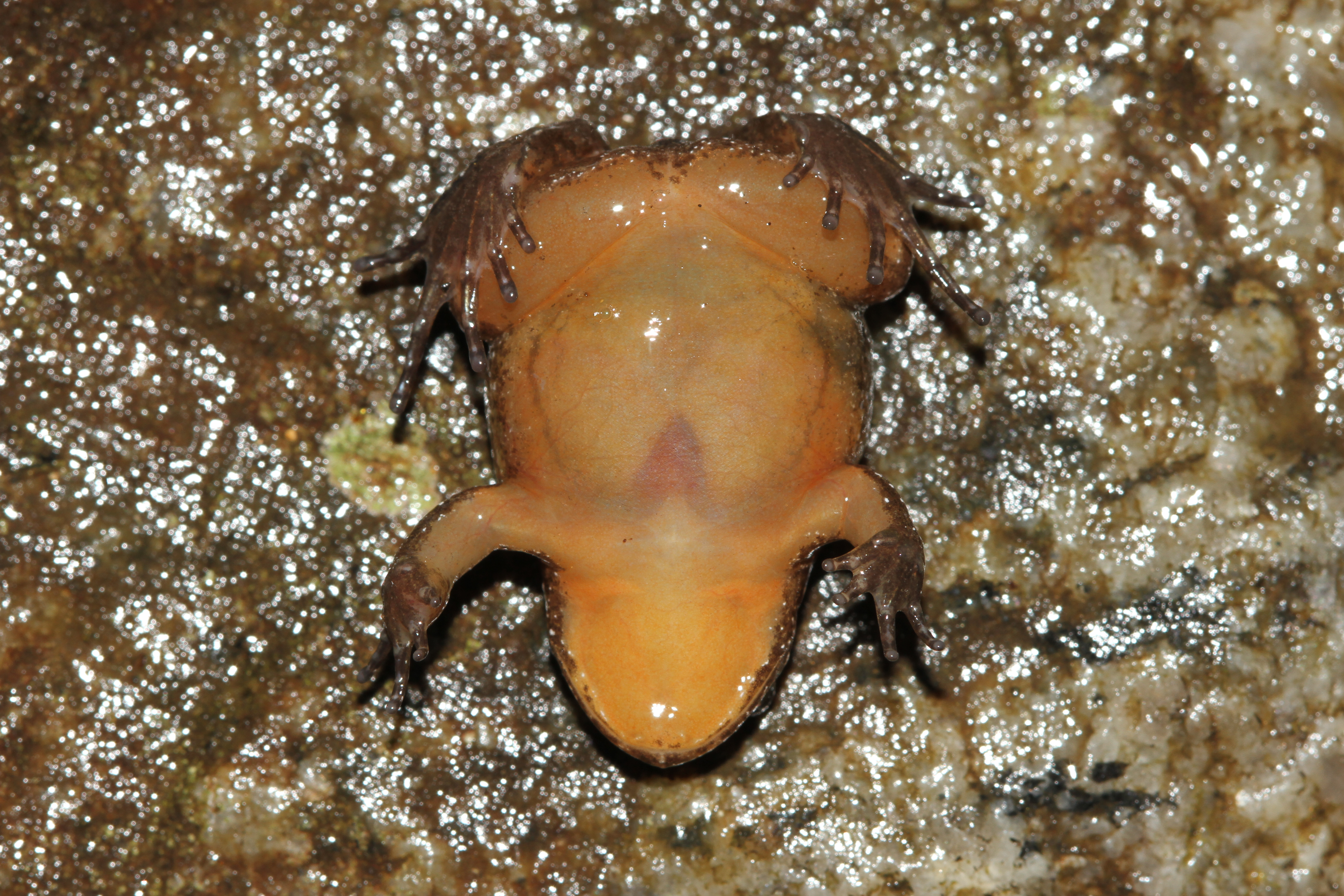
Ventral view

===== Nyctibatrachus grandis (Grandi's night frog) =====
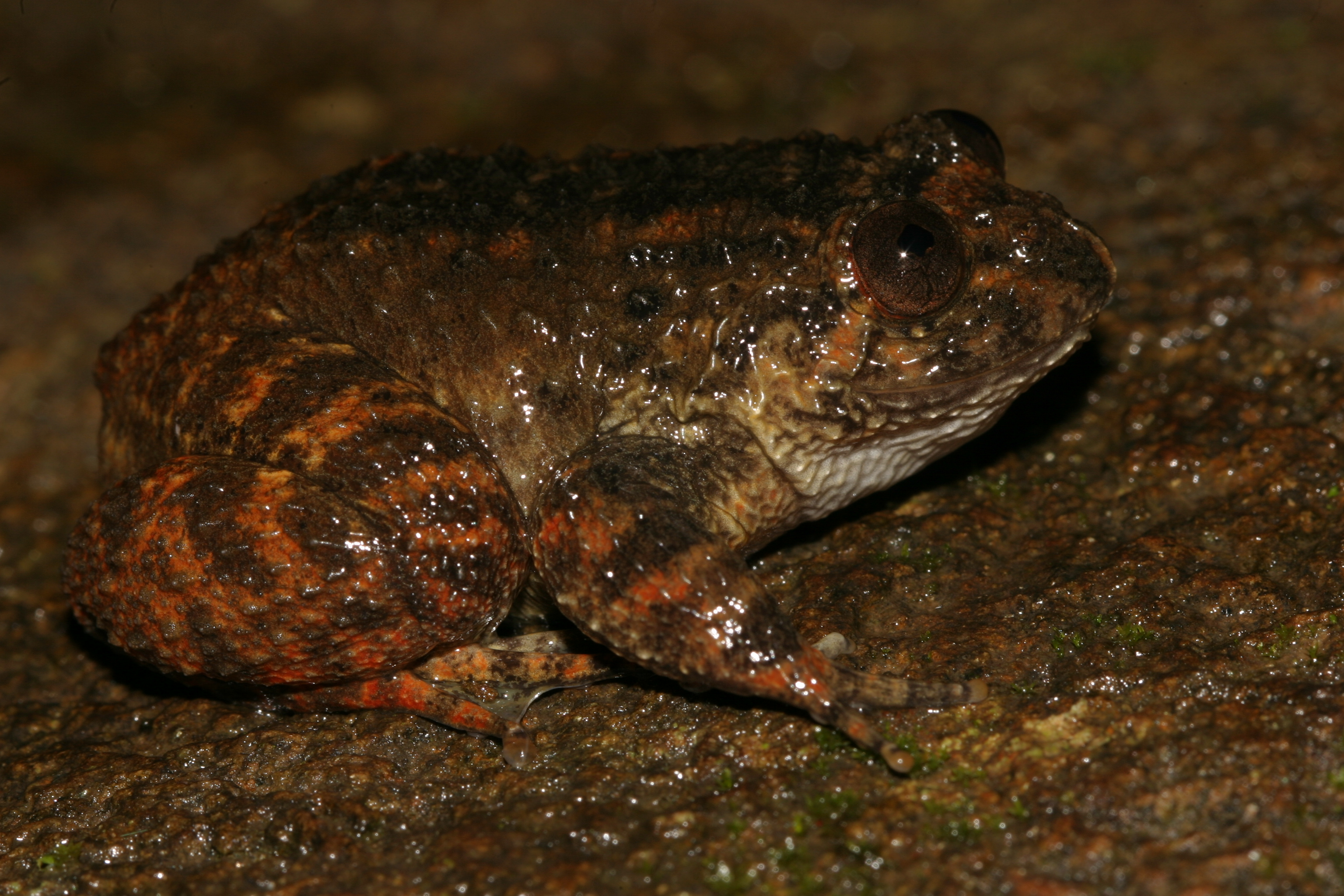
Lateral view

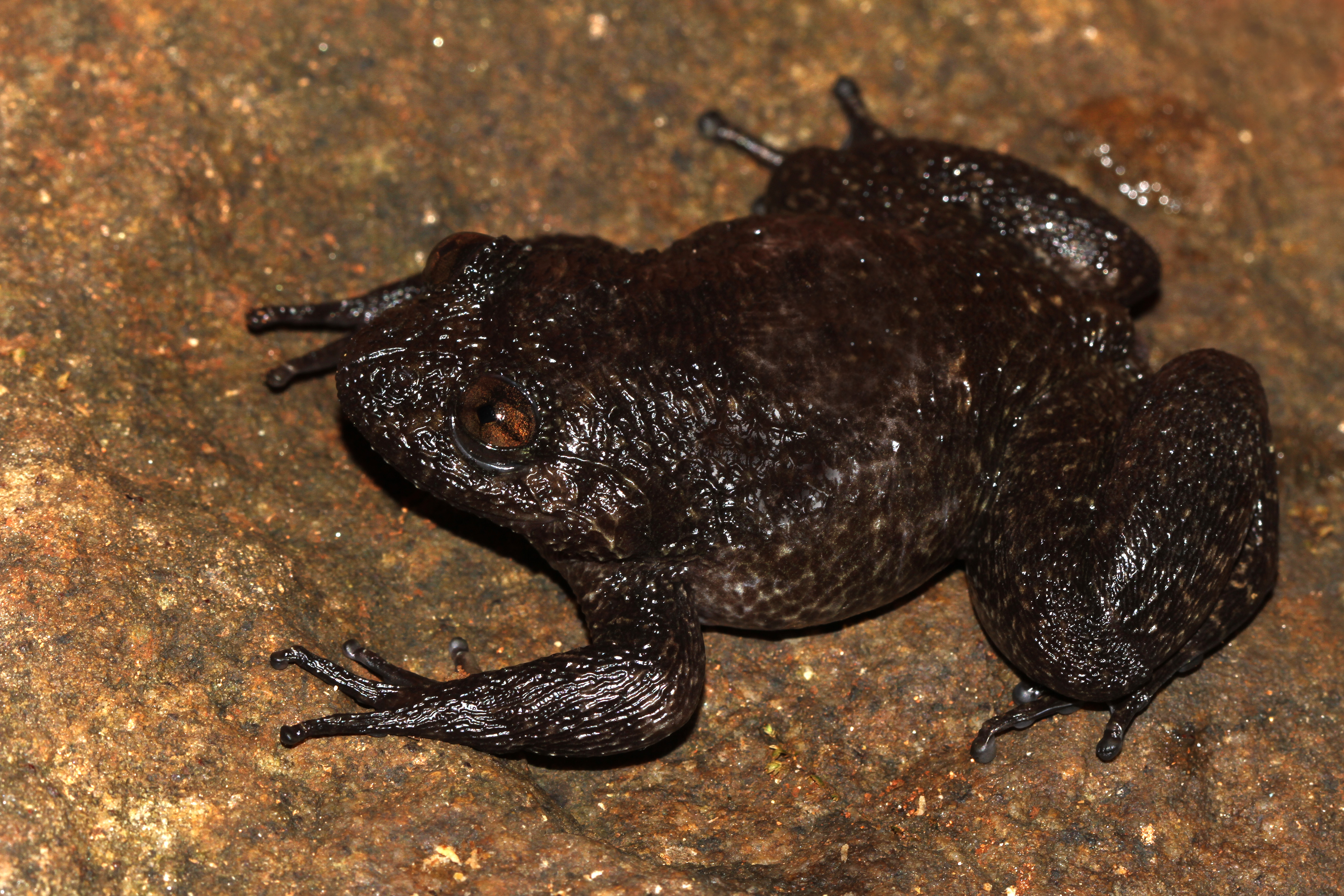
Lateral view

===== Nyctibatrachus kempholeyensis (Kempholey night frog) =====
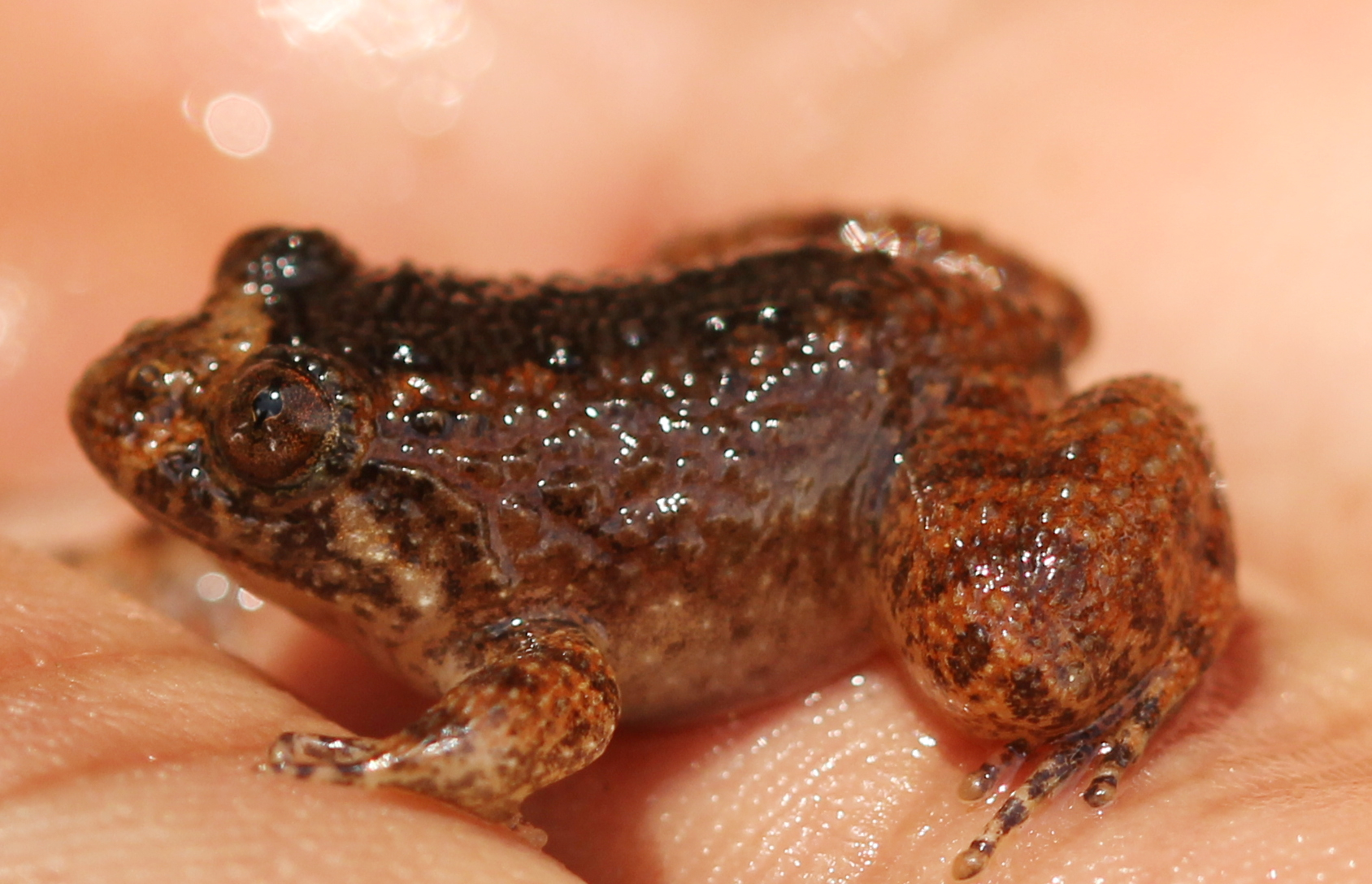
Lateral view

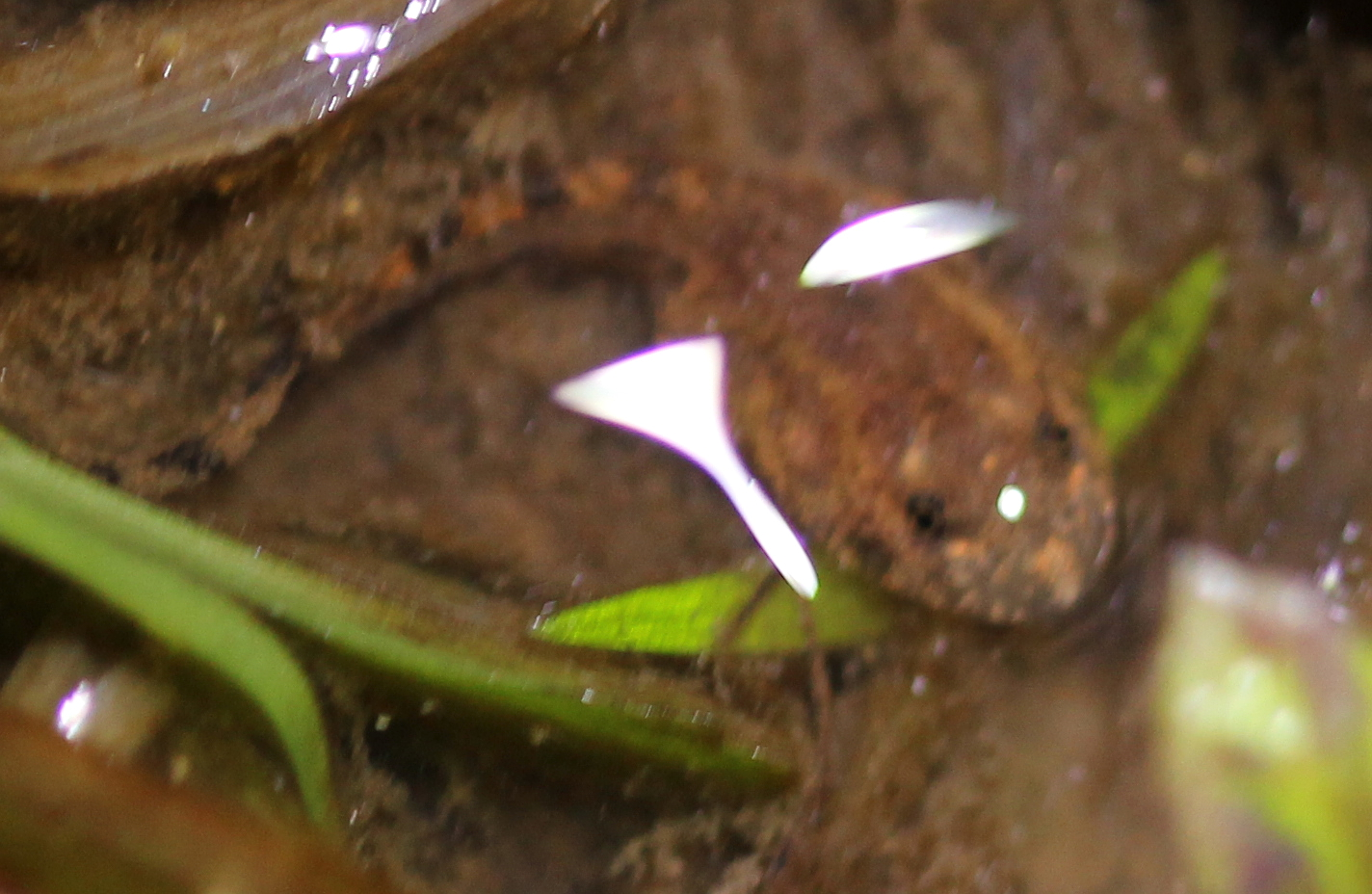
Tadpole

===== Nyctibatrachus major (Malabar night frog) =====
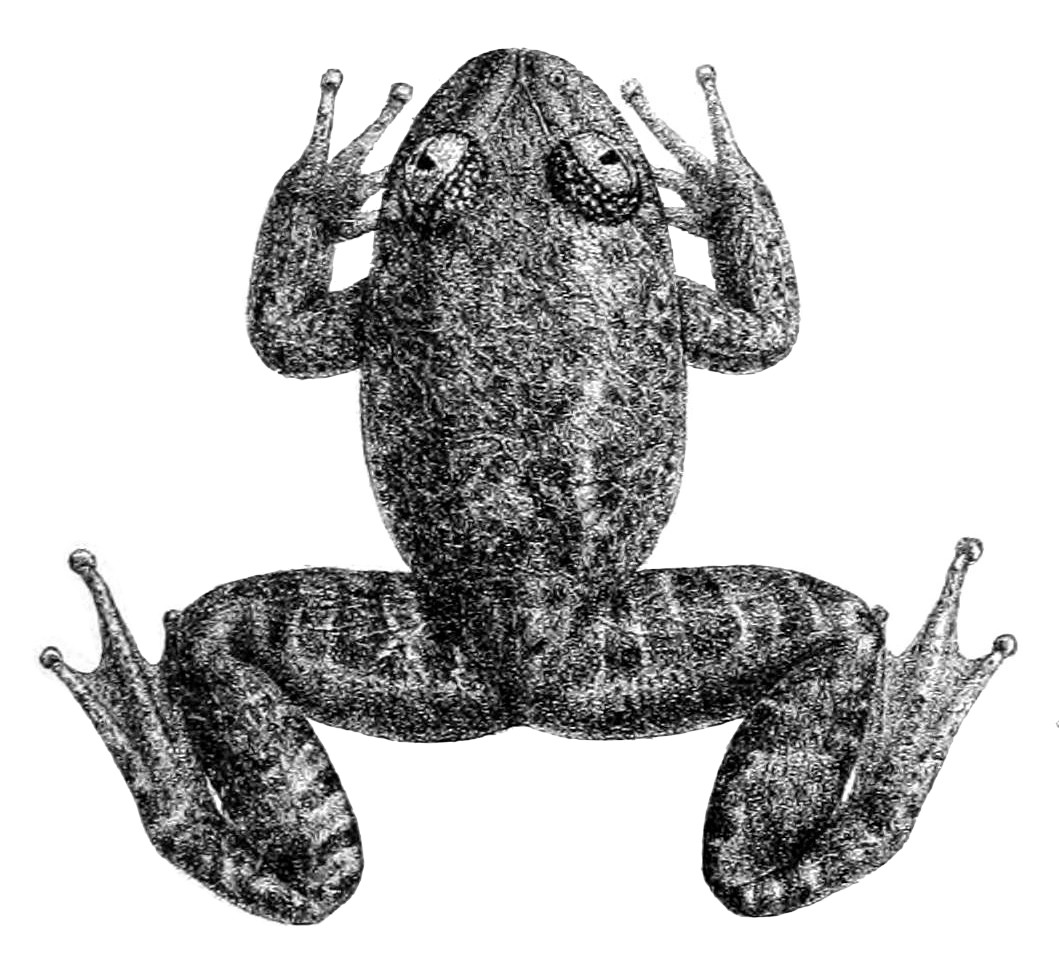
Illustration

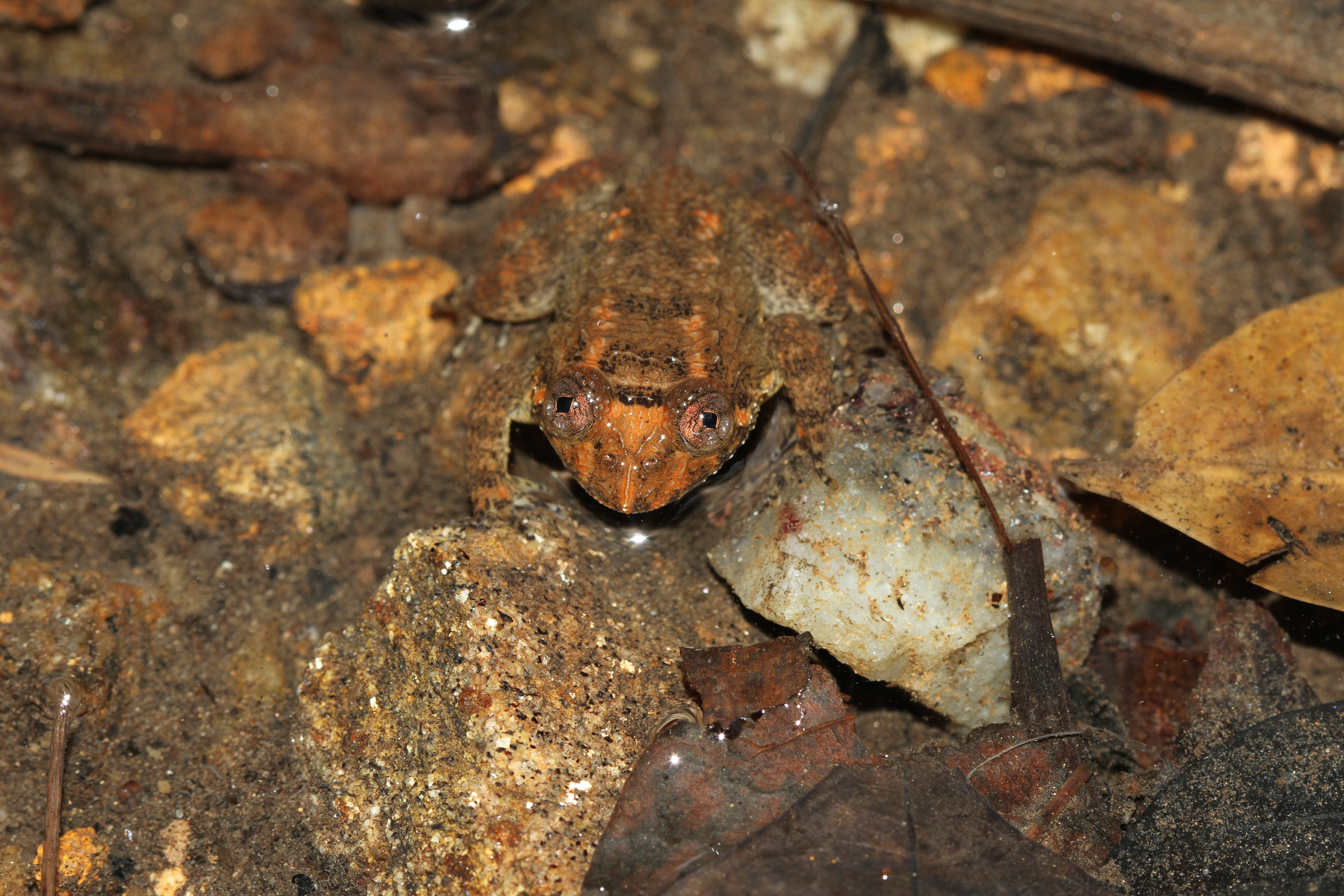
Lateral view

===== Nyctibatrachus minimus (miniature night frog) =====
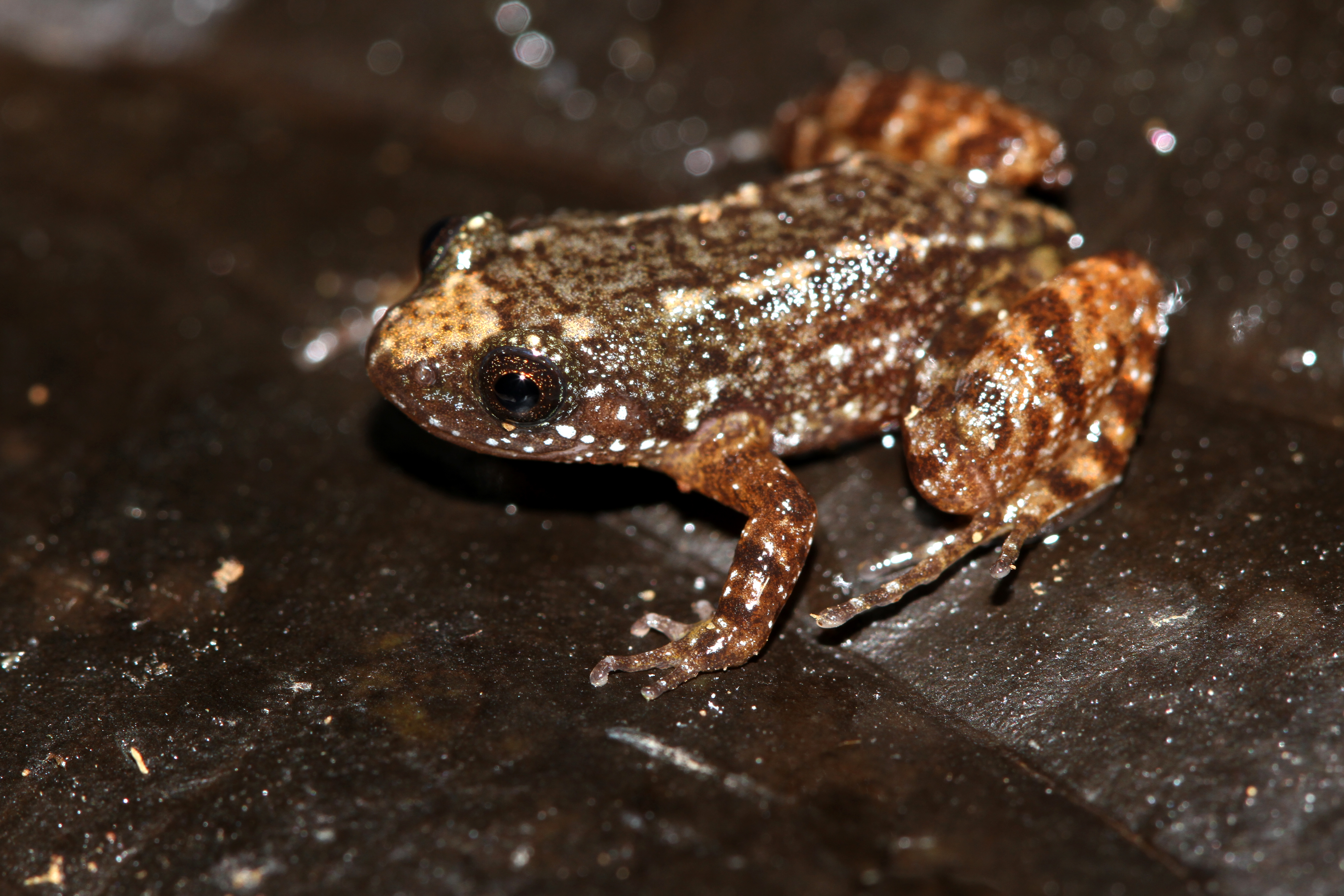
Lateral view

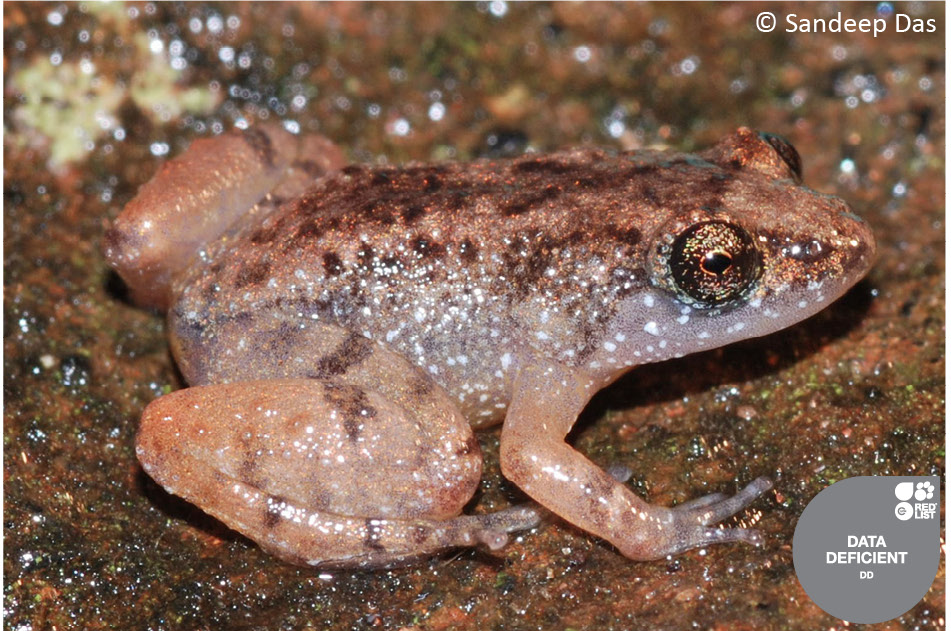
Lateral view

===== Nyctibatrachus minor (Kerala night frog) =====
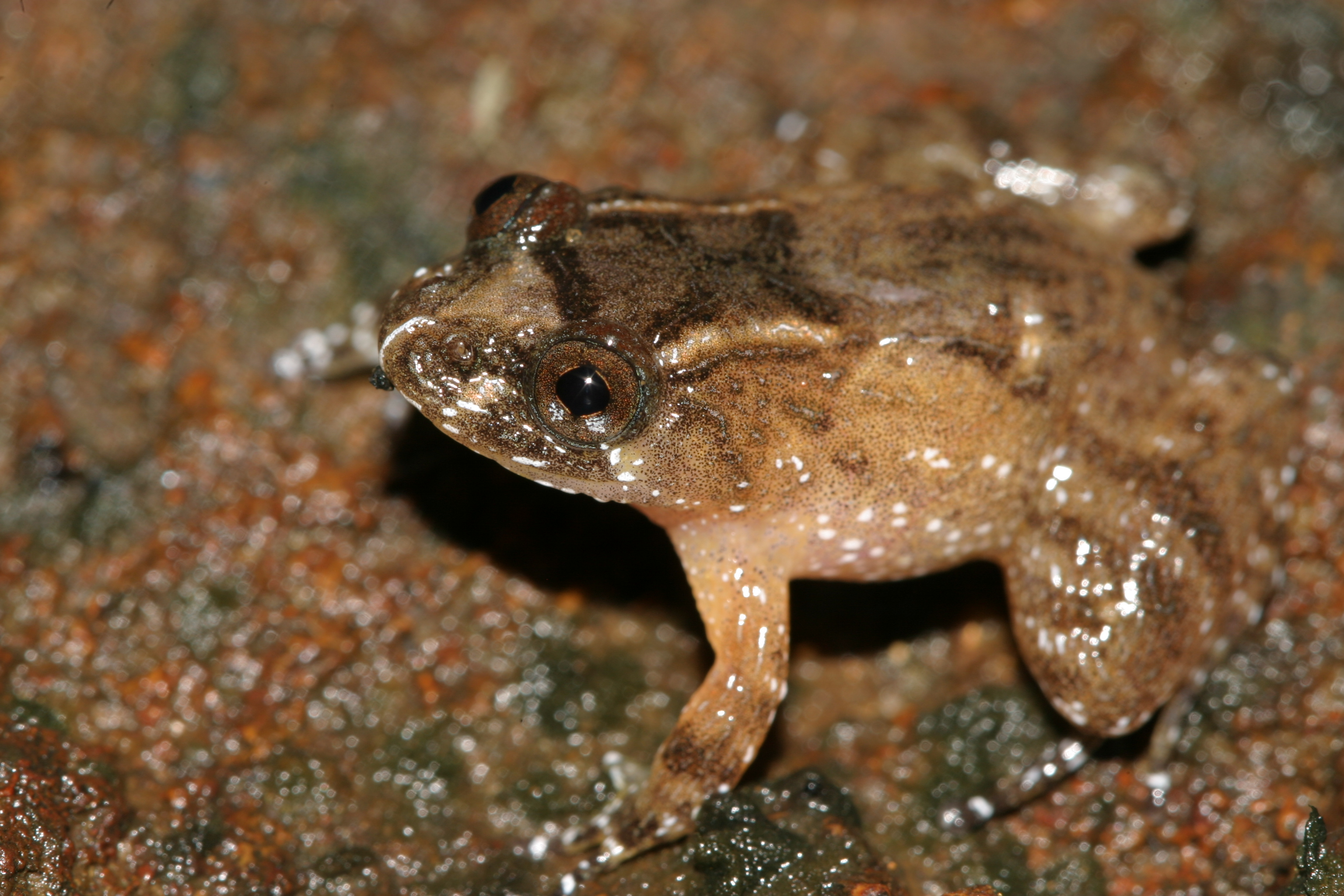
Lateral view

=== Family: Ranidae (True frogs) ===
==== Genus: Clinotarsus ====
===== Clinotarsus curtipes (bicolored frog) =====
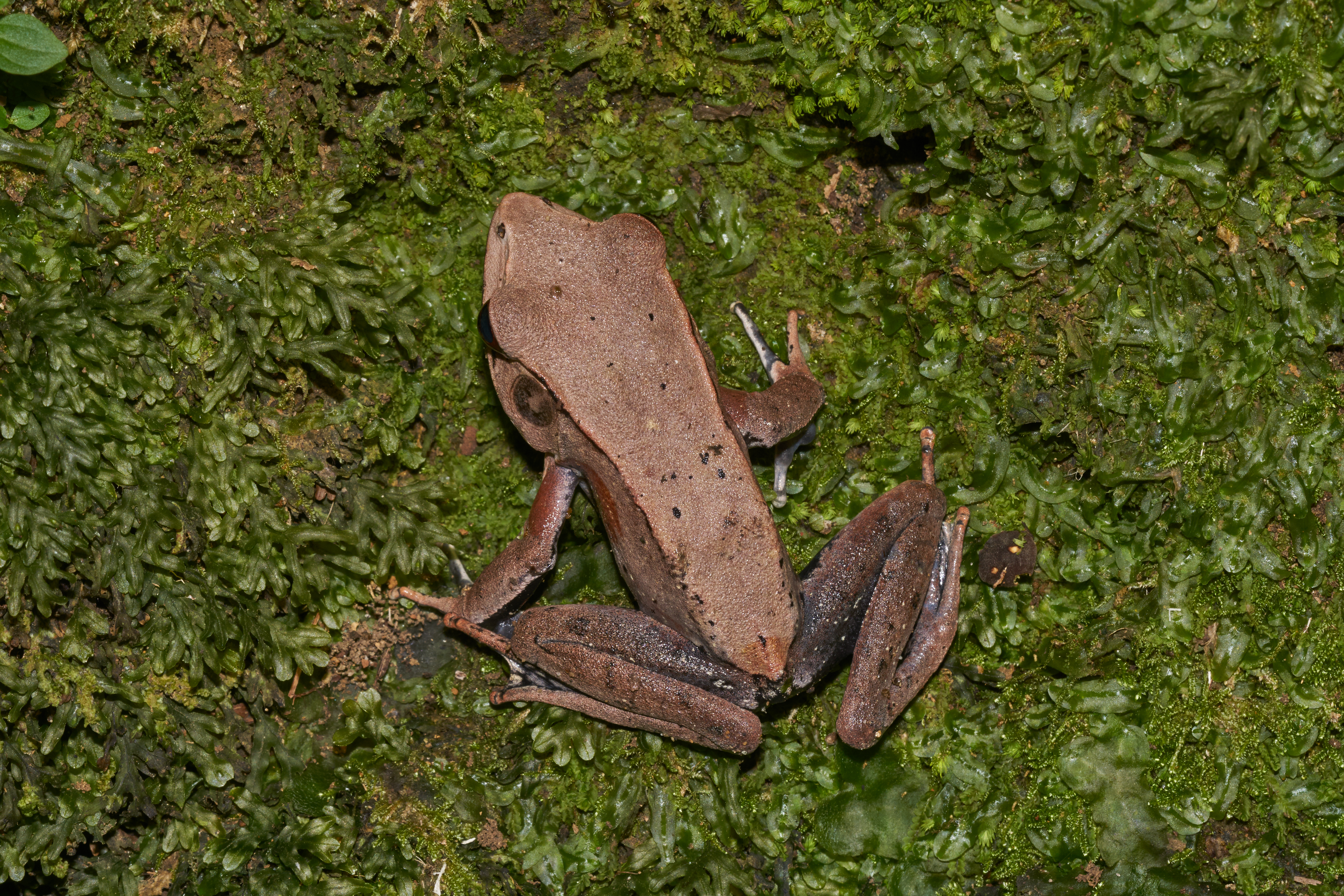
Dorsal view

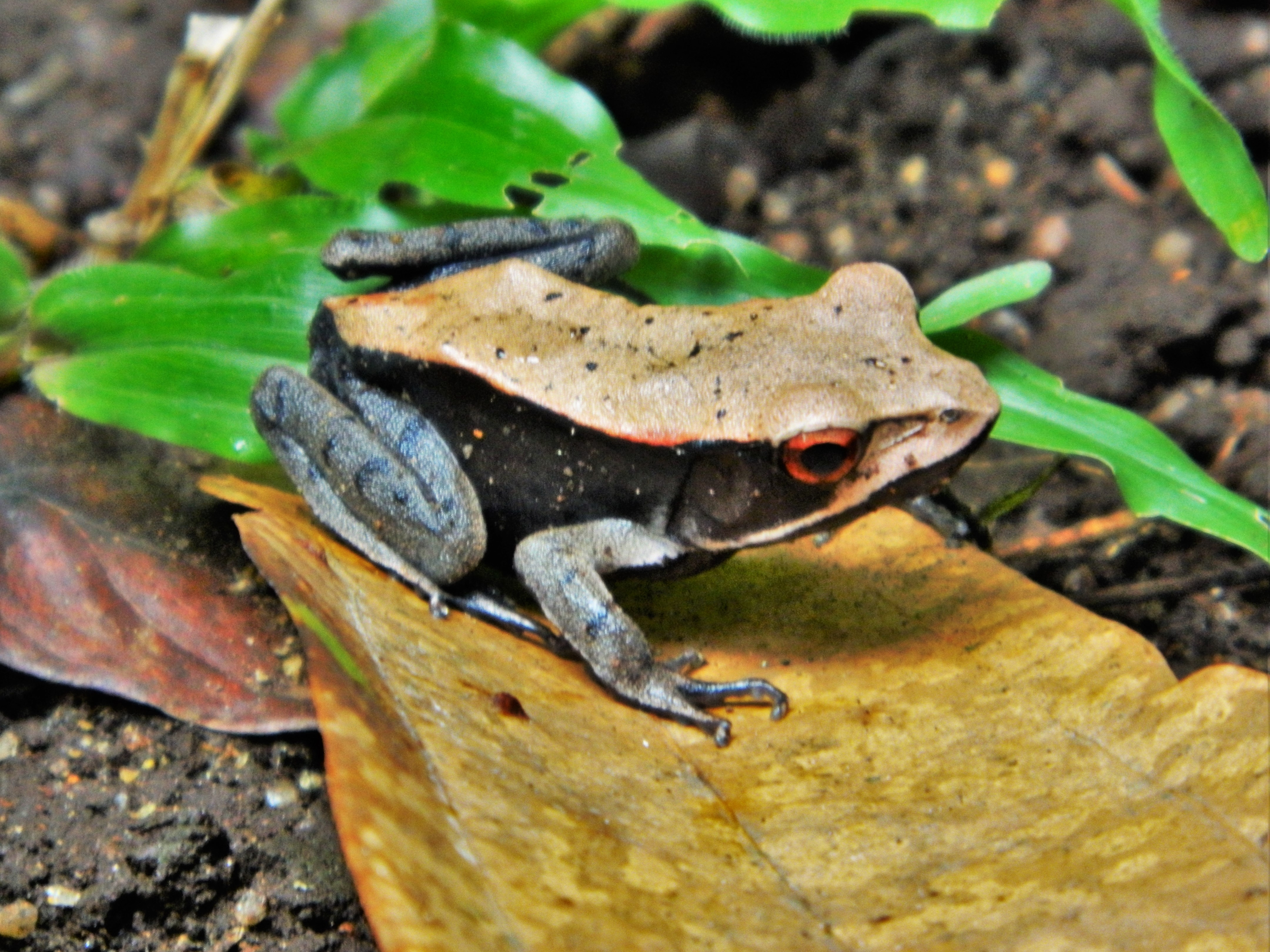
Lateral view

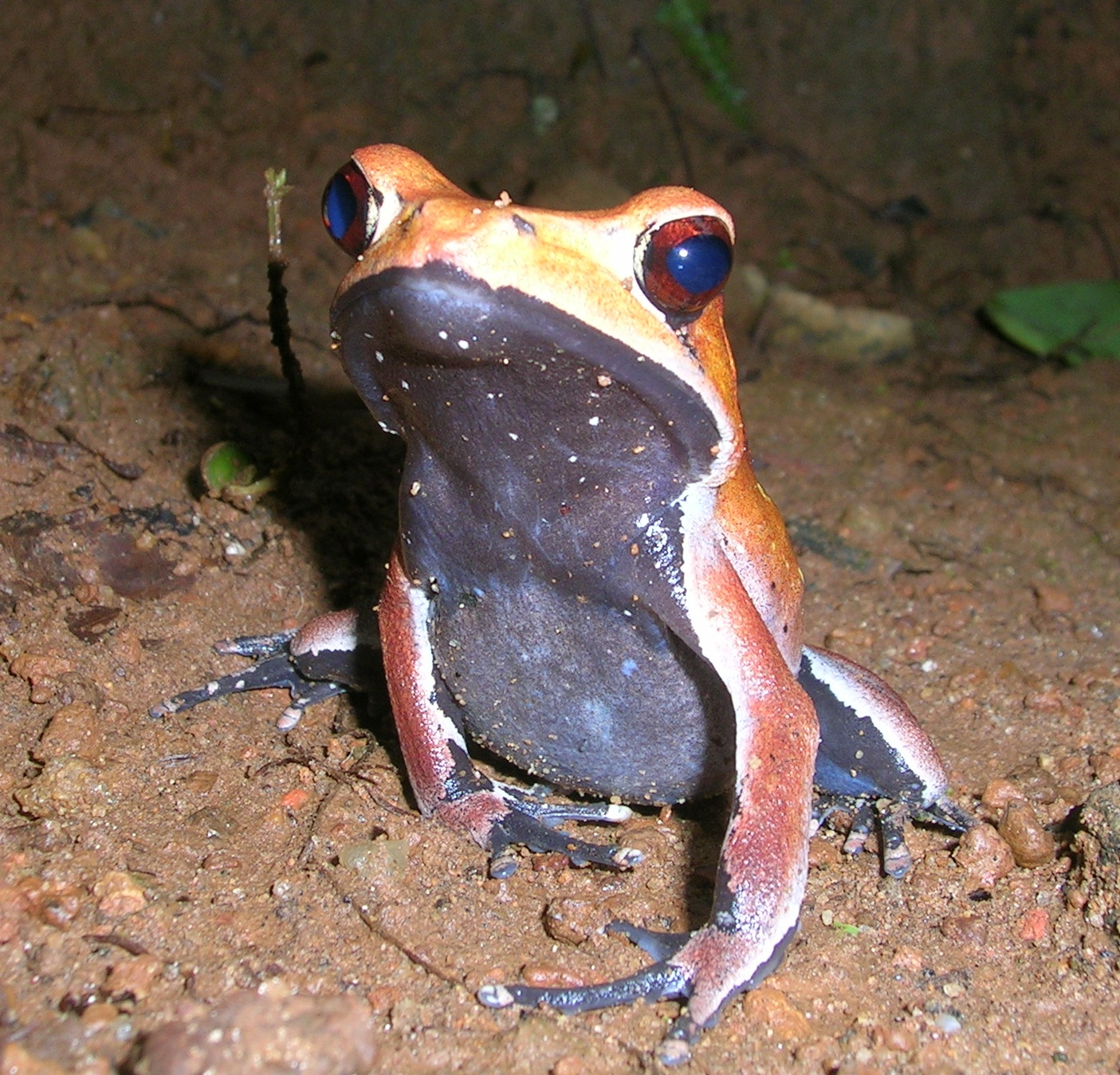
Front view

==== Genus: Hydrophylax ====
===== Hydrophylax malabaricus (fungoid frog) =====
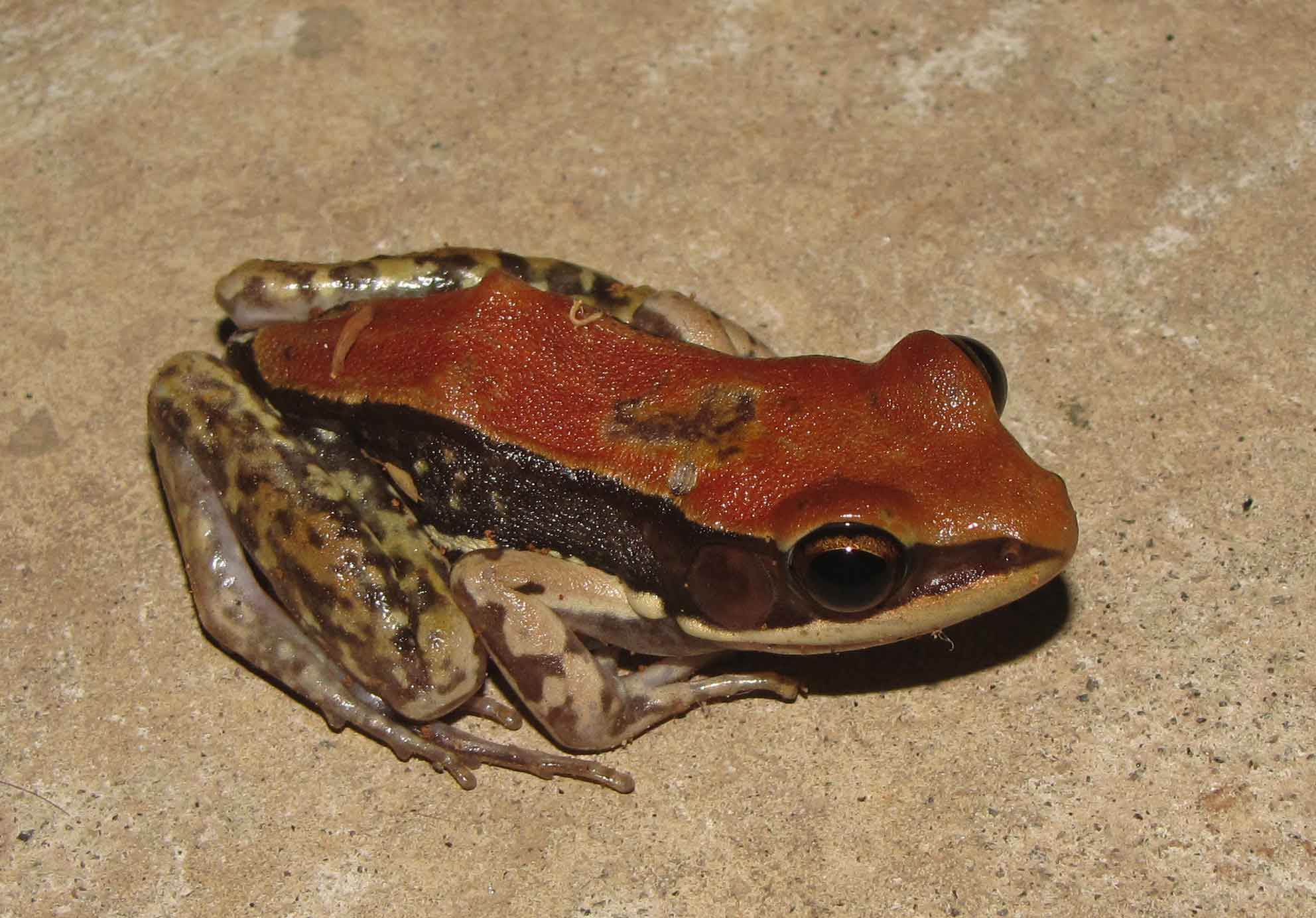
Dorsal view

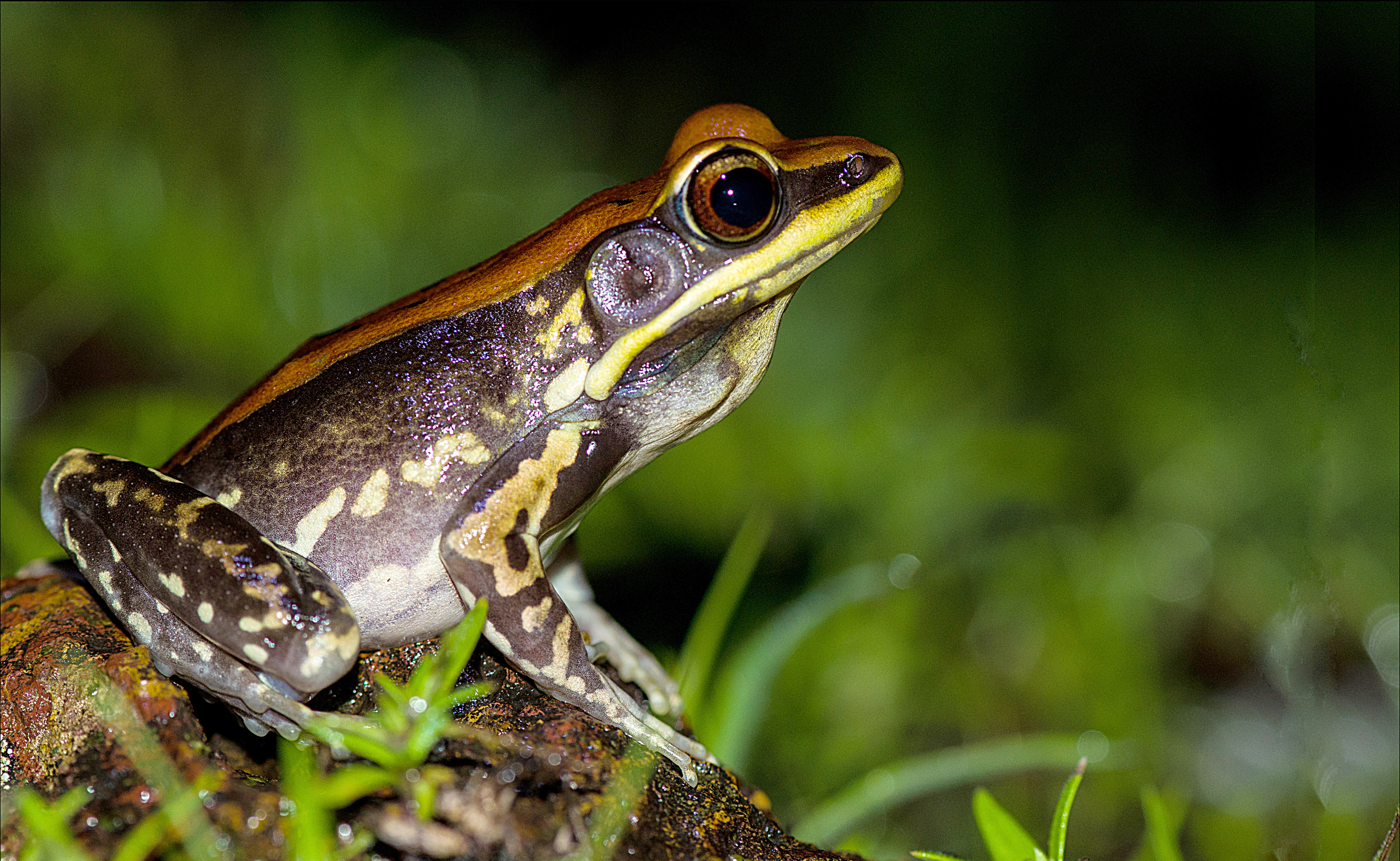
Lateral view

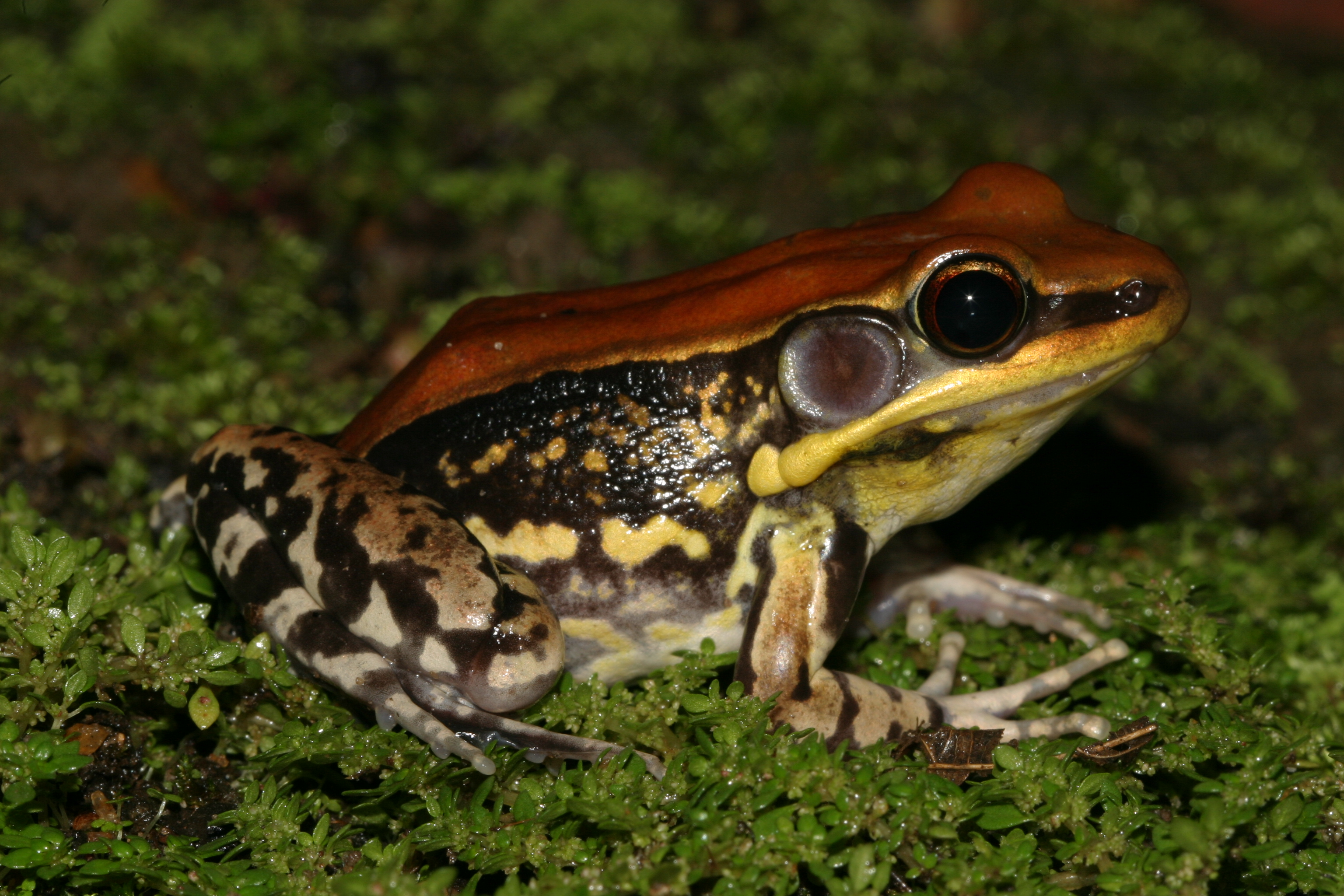
Lateral view

==== Genus: Indosylvirana ====
===== Indosylvirana aurantiaca (Boulenger's golden backed frog) =====
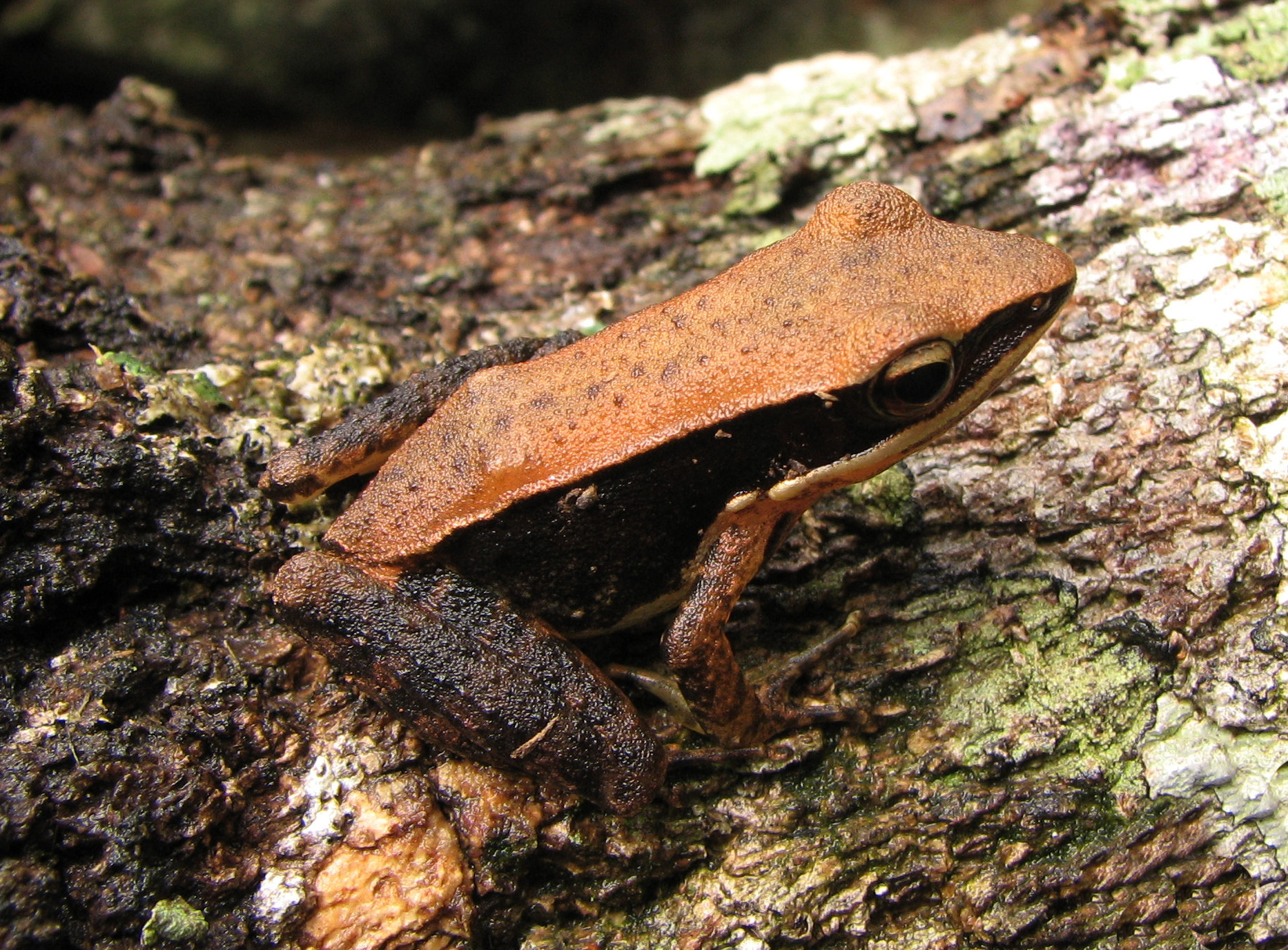
Dorsal view

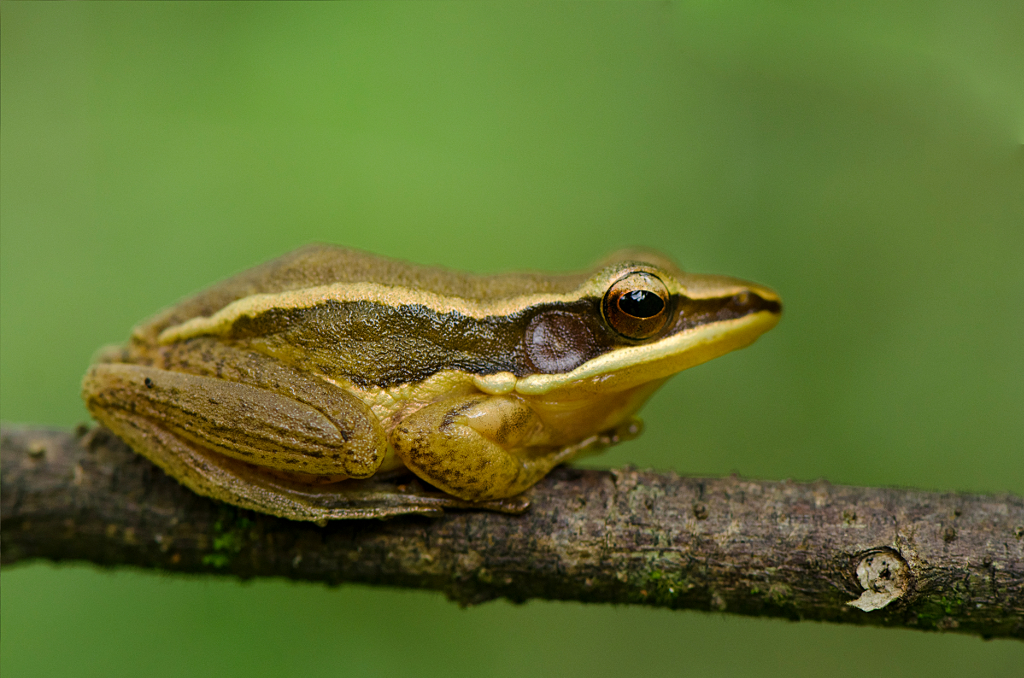
Lateral view

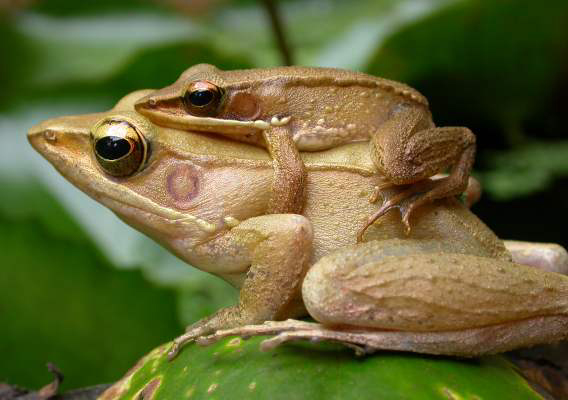
Mating

===== Indosylvirana magna (large golden backed frog) =====
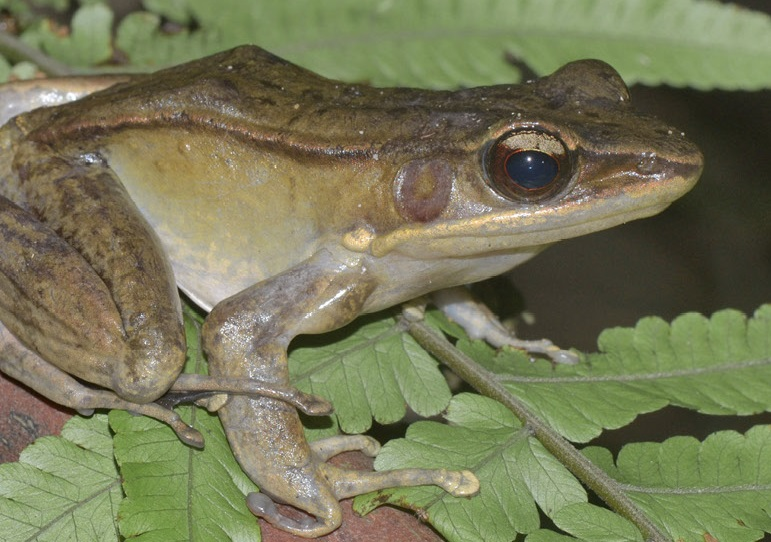
Lateral view

===== Indosylvirana sreeni (Sreeni's golden backed frog) =====
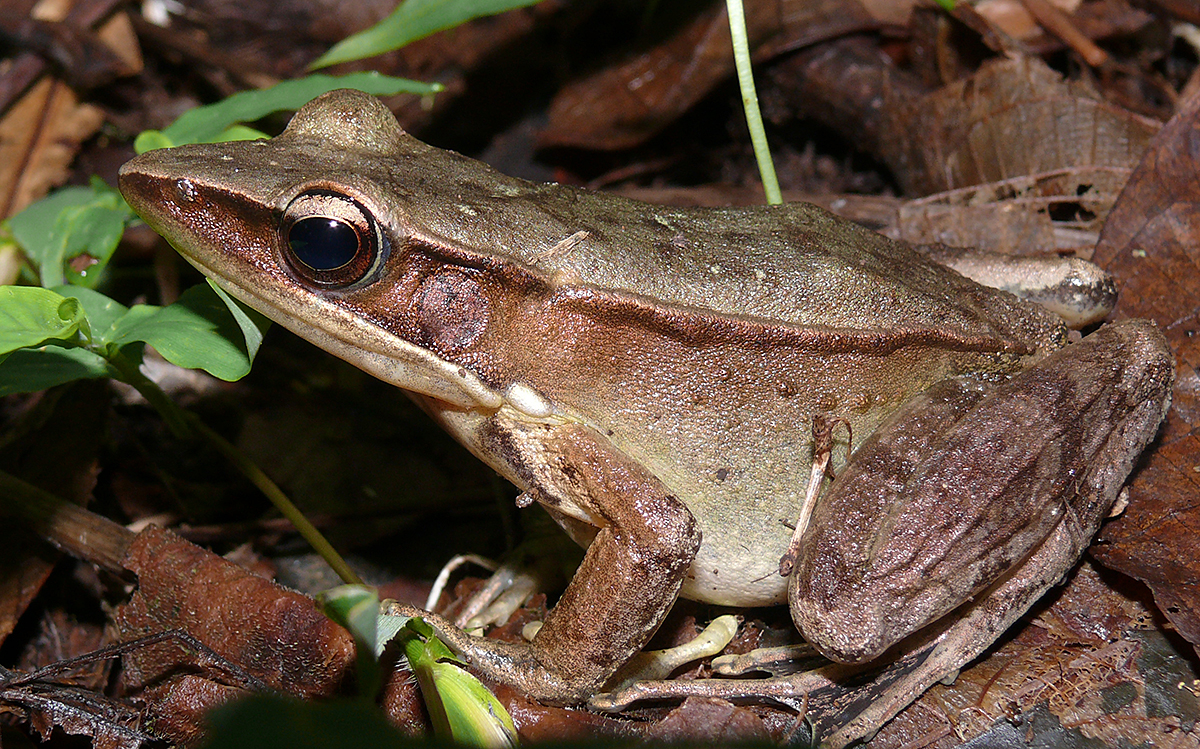
Lateral view

===== Indosylvirana urbis (urban golden backed frog) =====
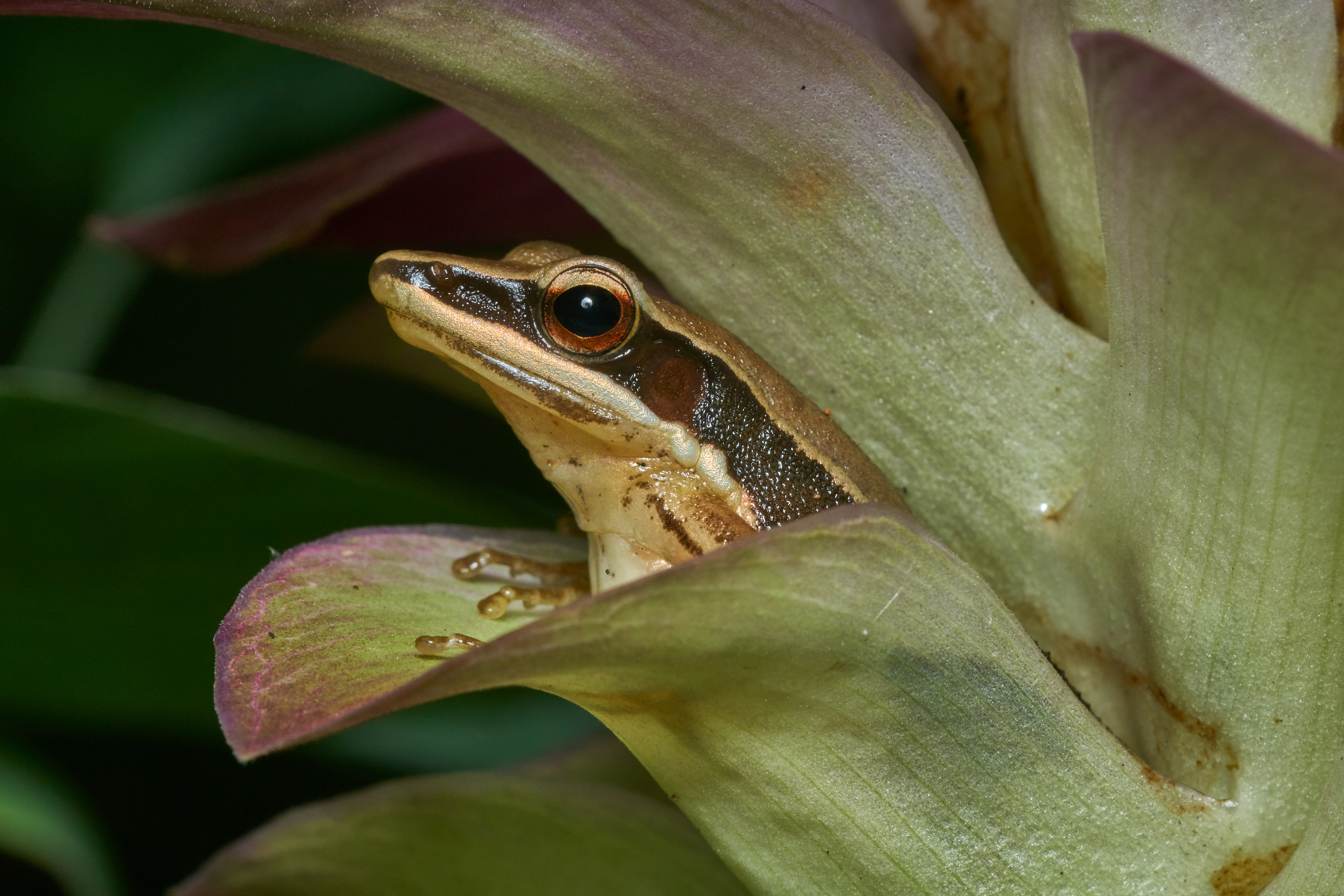
Lateral view

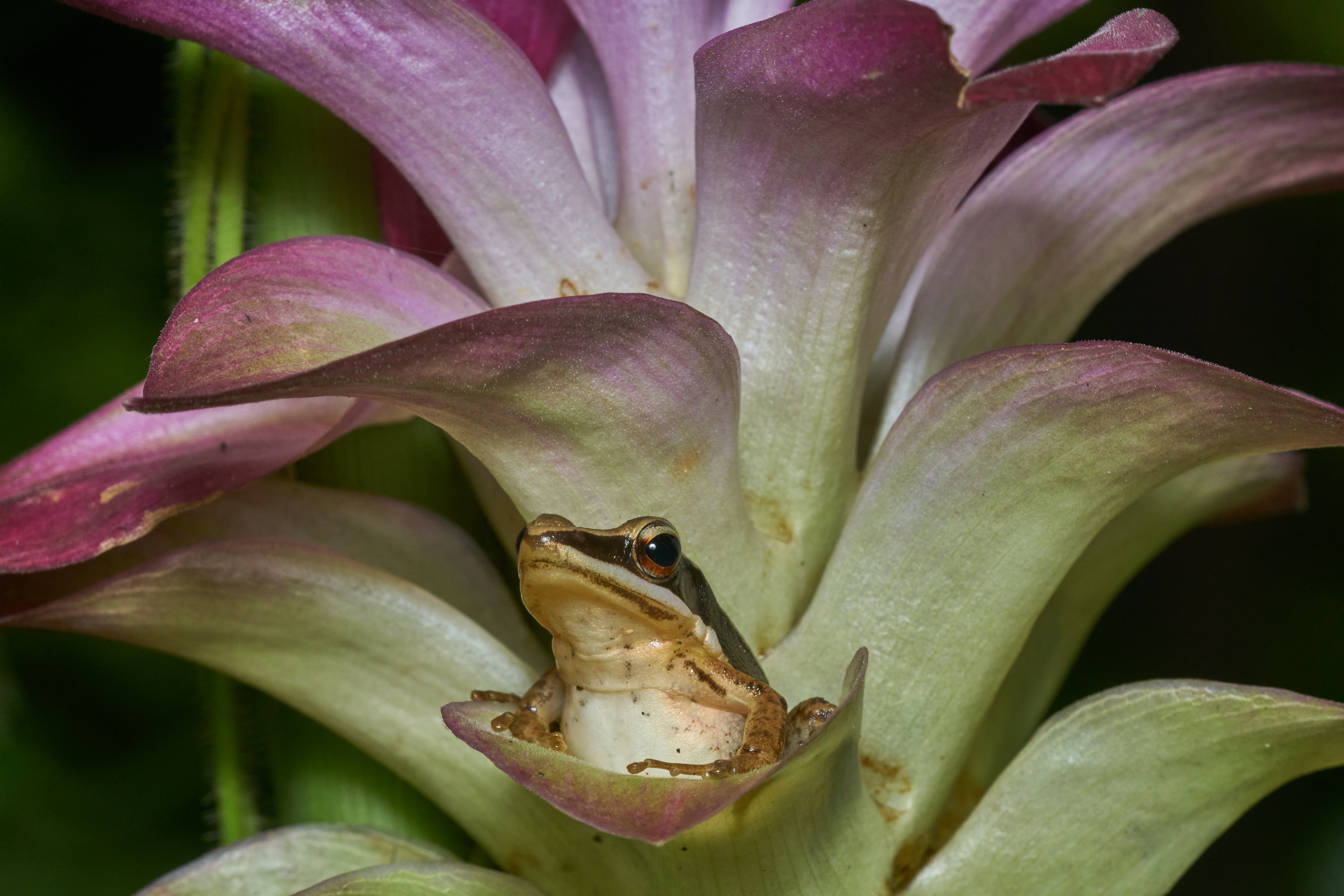
Front view

=== Family: Ranixalidae (leaping frogs) ===
==== Genus: Indirana ====
===== Indirana beddomii (Beddome's leaping frog) =====
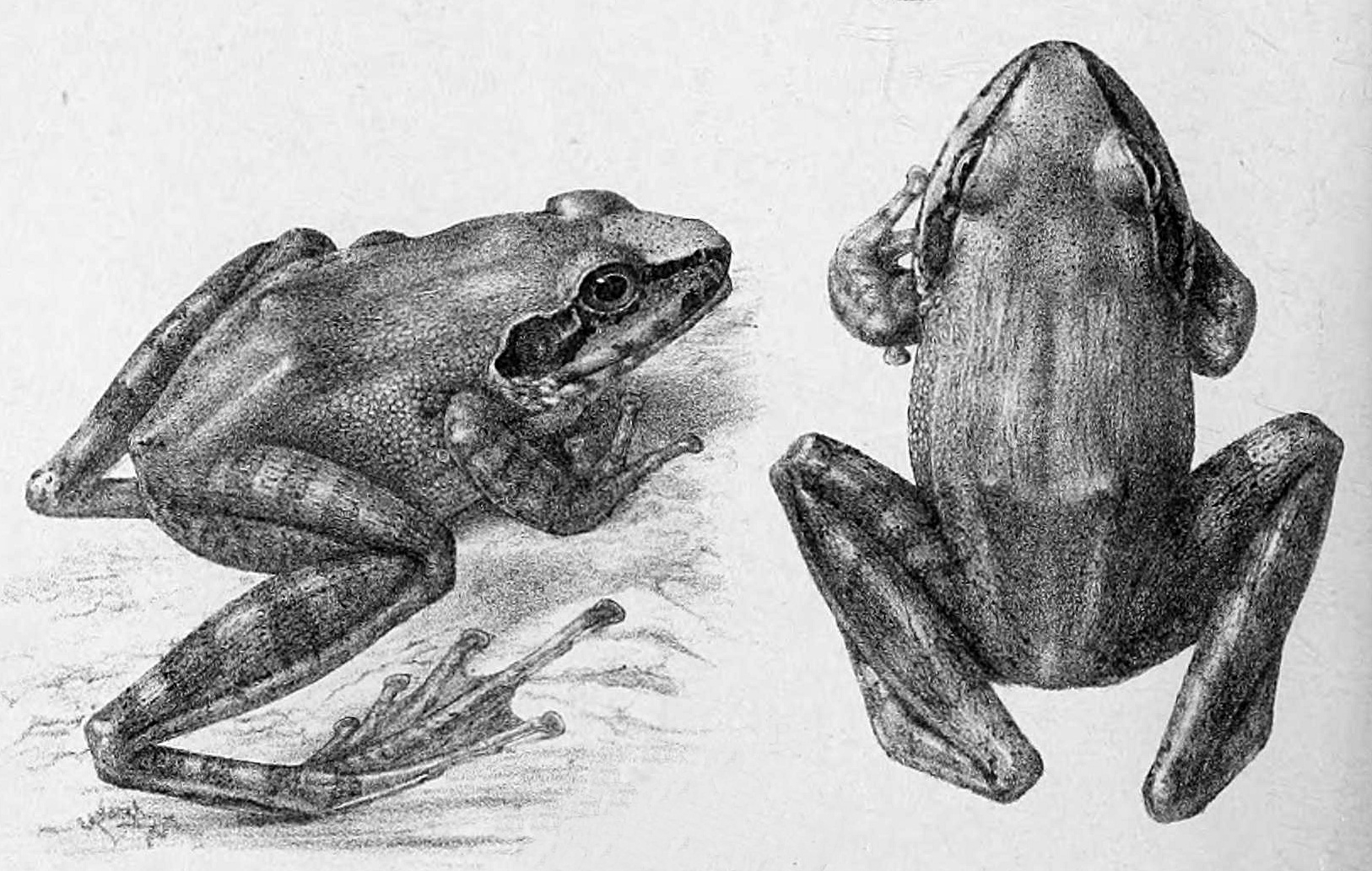
Illustration

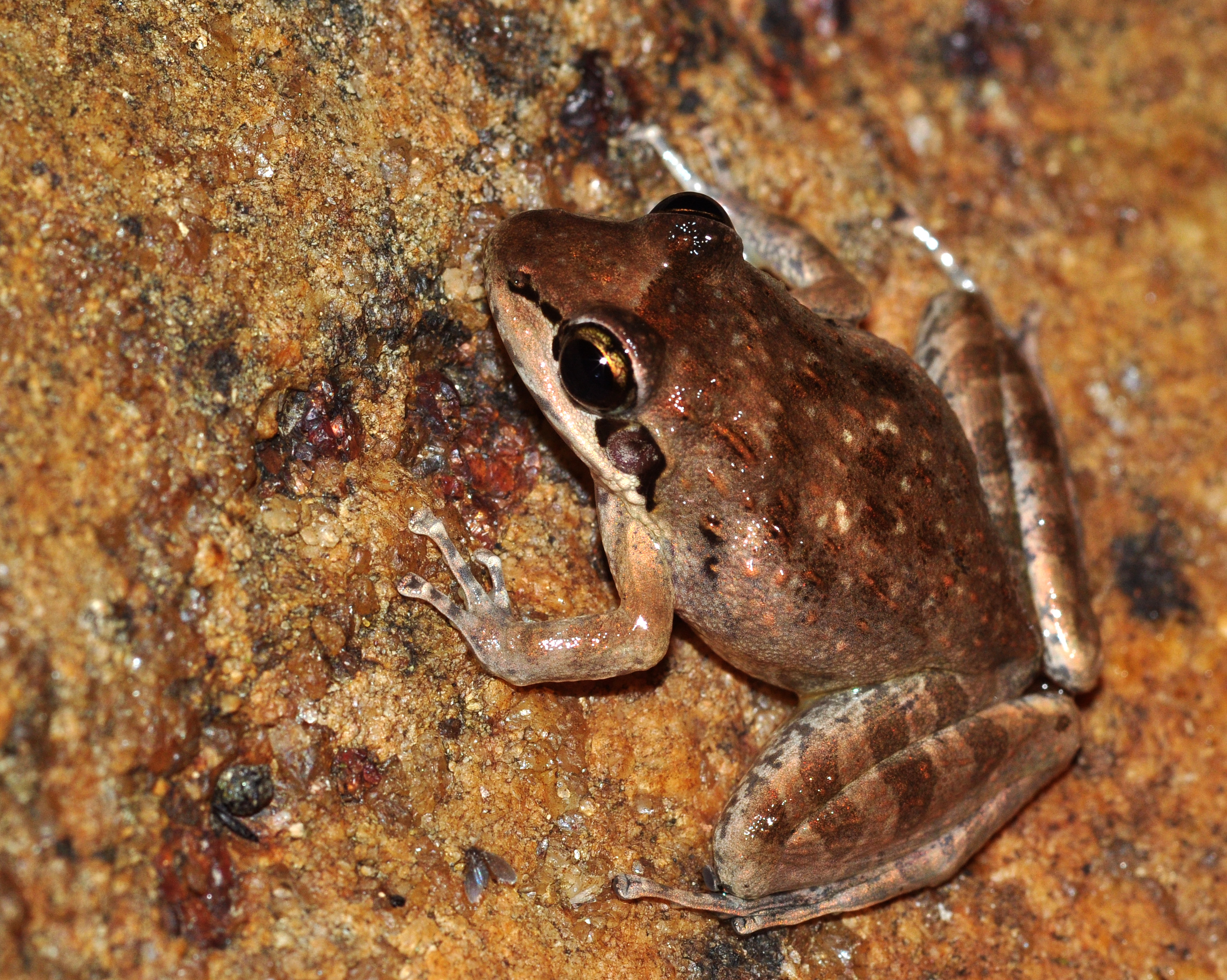
Dorsal view

===== Indirana diplosticta (spotted leaping frog) =====
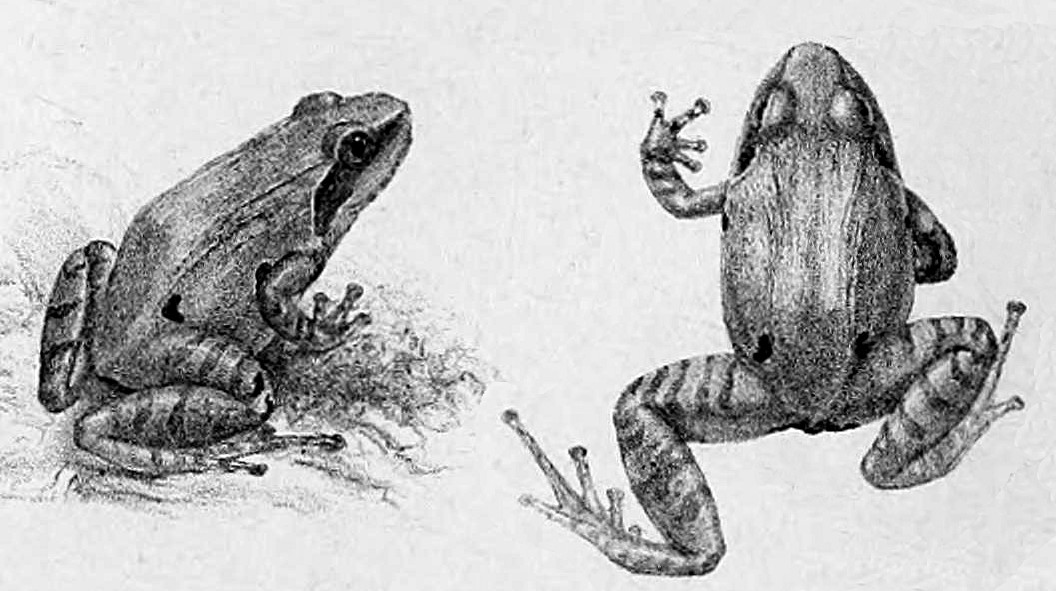
Illustration

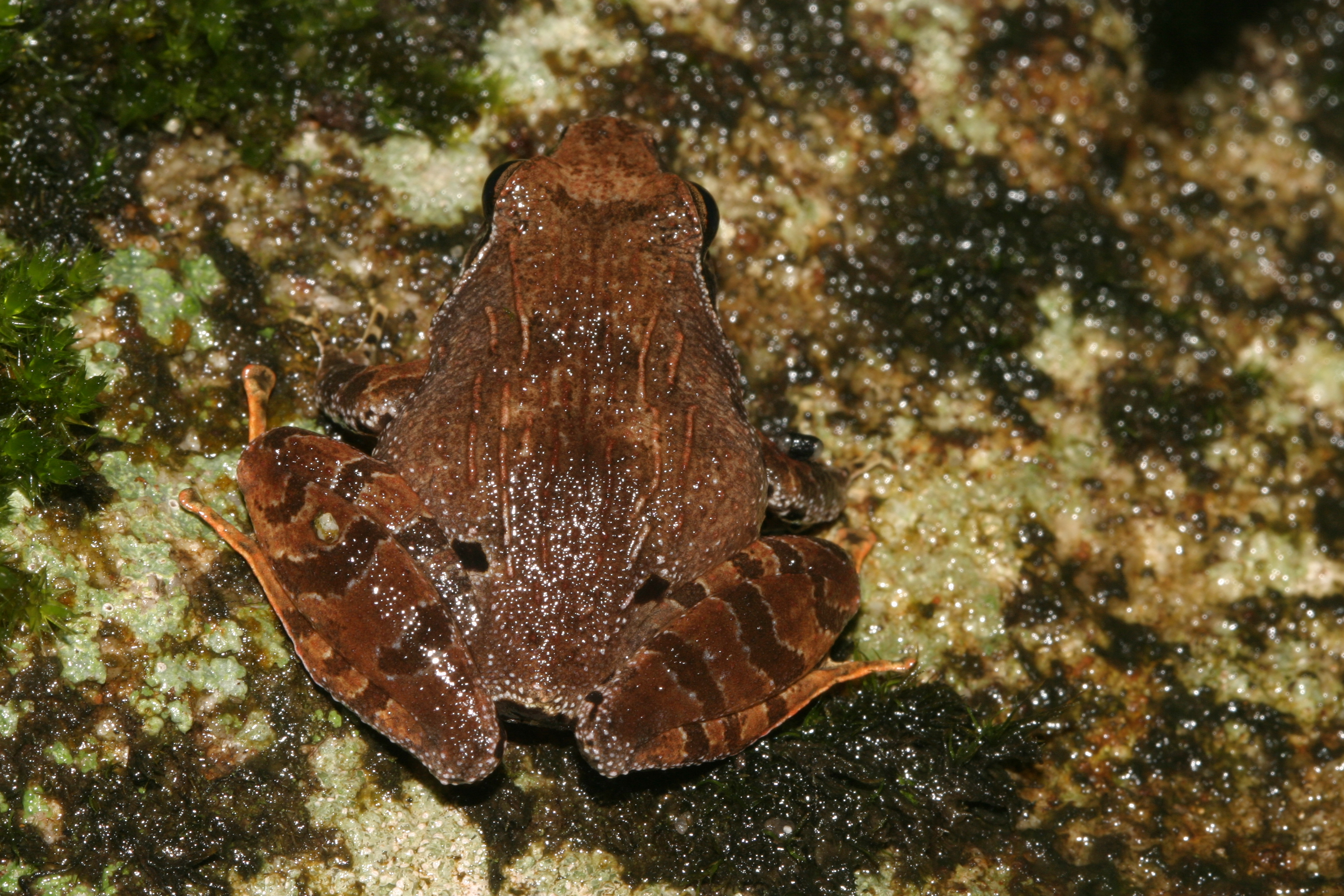
Dorsal view

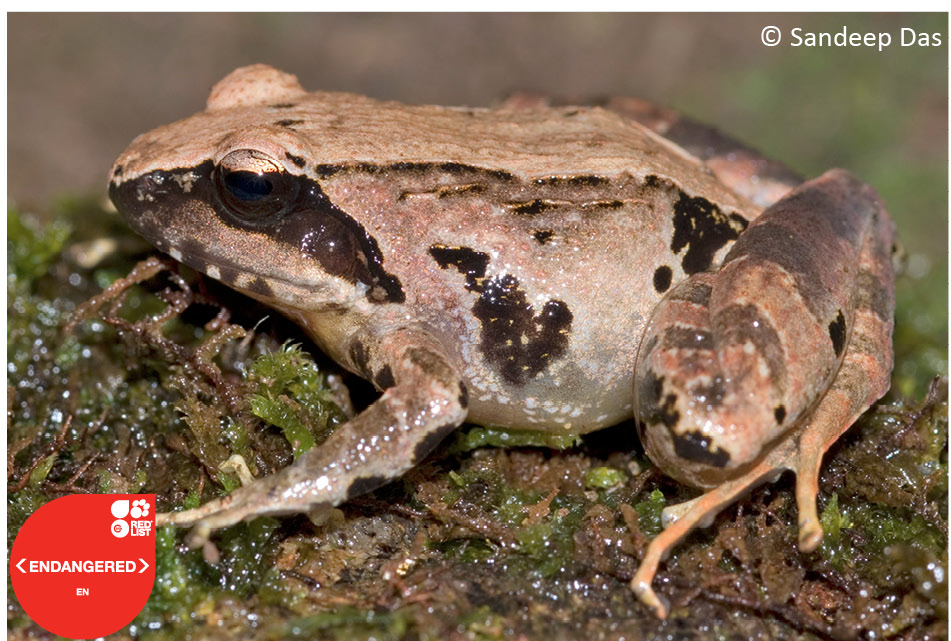
Lateral view

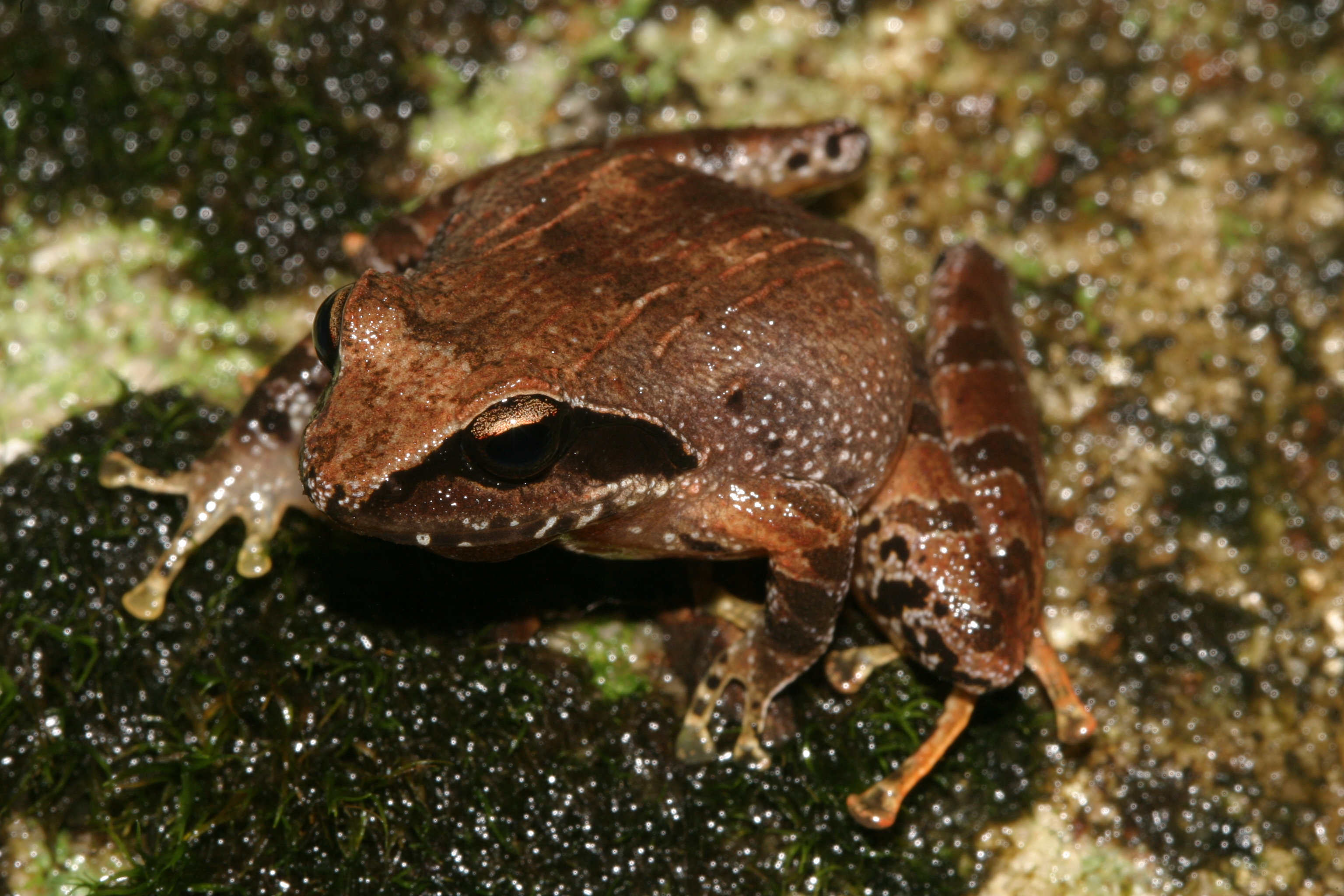
Front view

===== Indirana phrynoderma (toad skinned leaping frog) =====
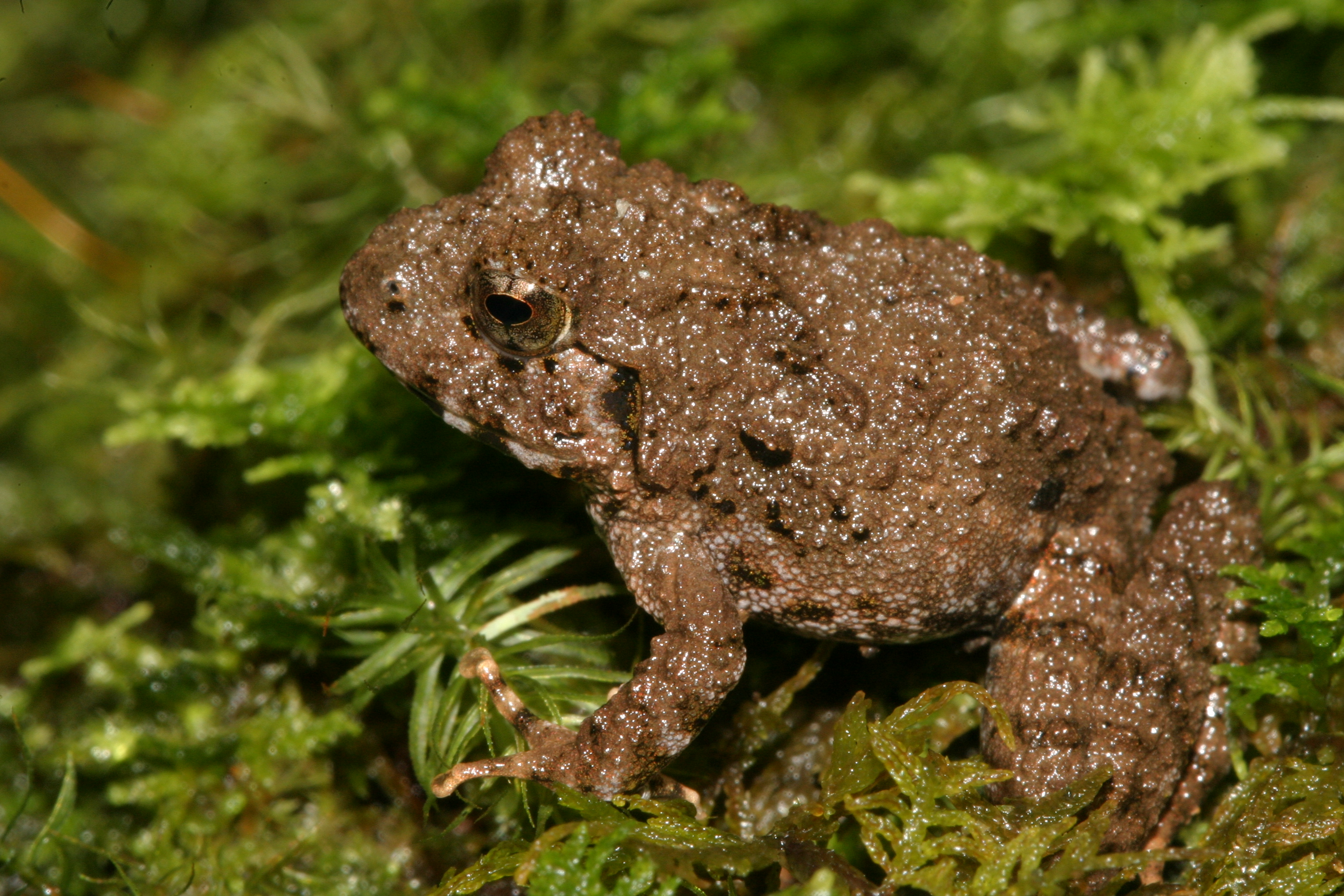
Lateral view

===== Indirana semipalmata (toad skinned leaping frog) =====
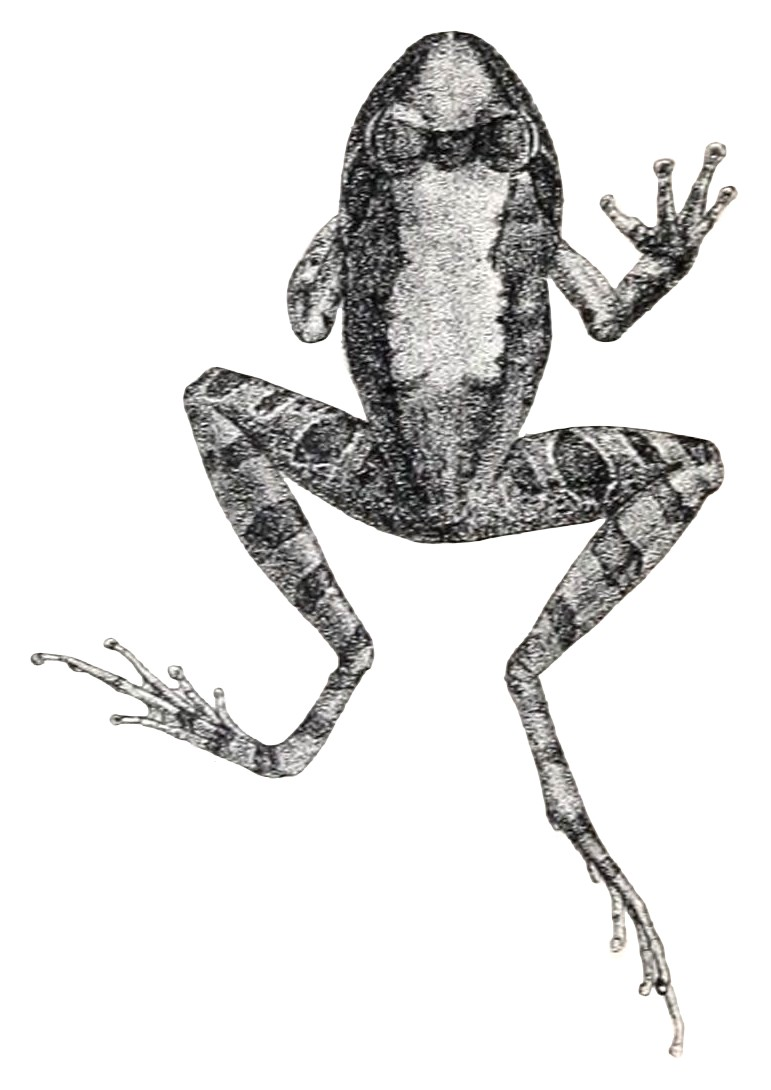
Illustration

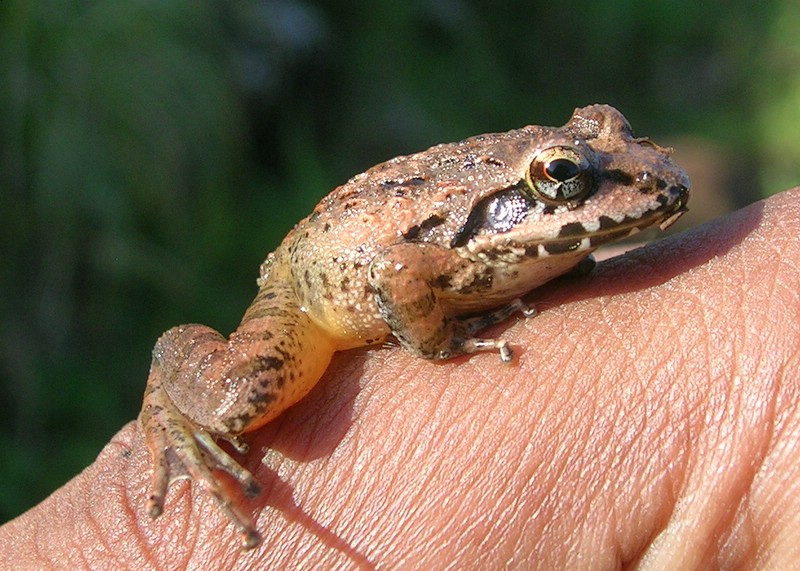
Lateral view

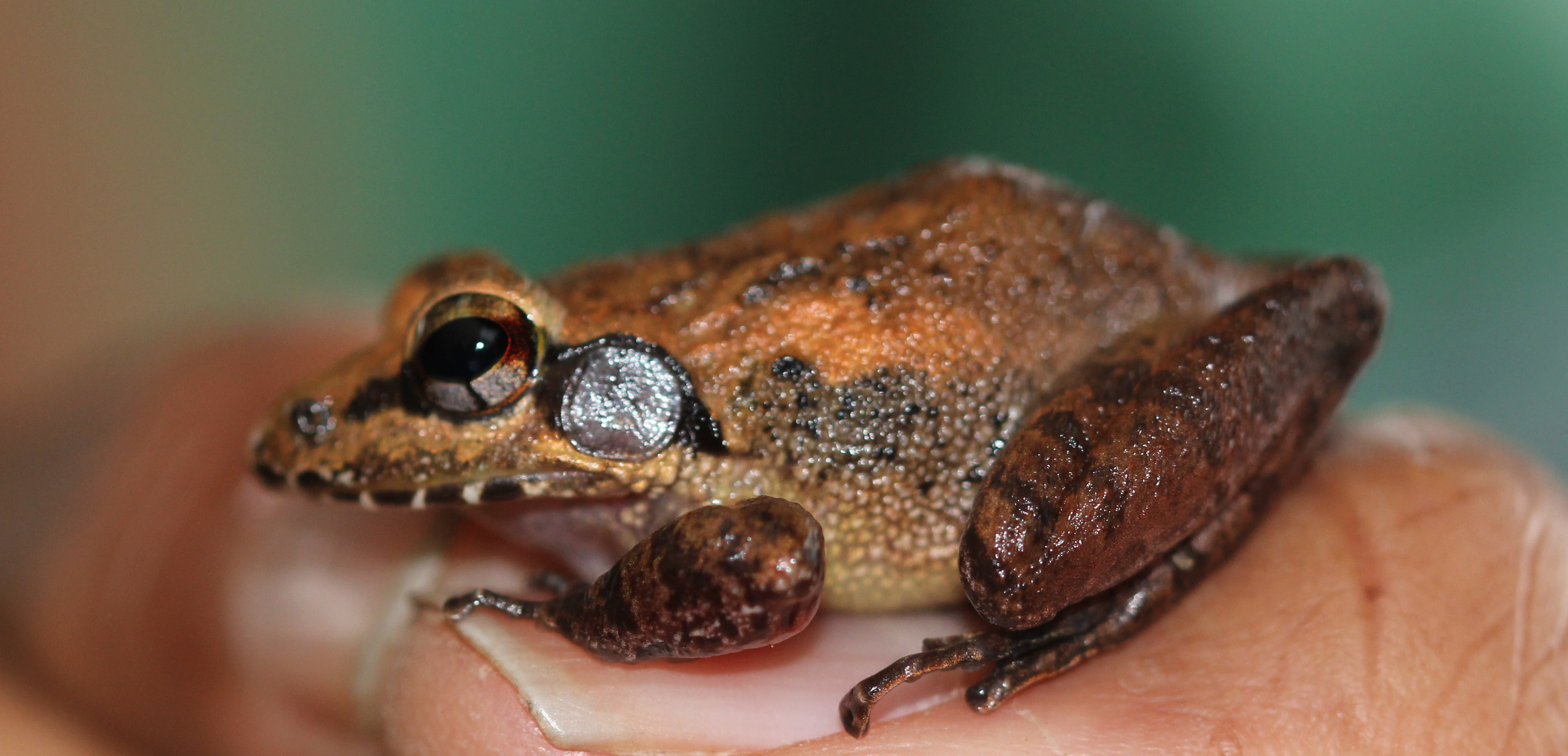
Lateral view

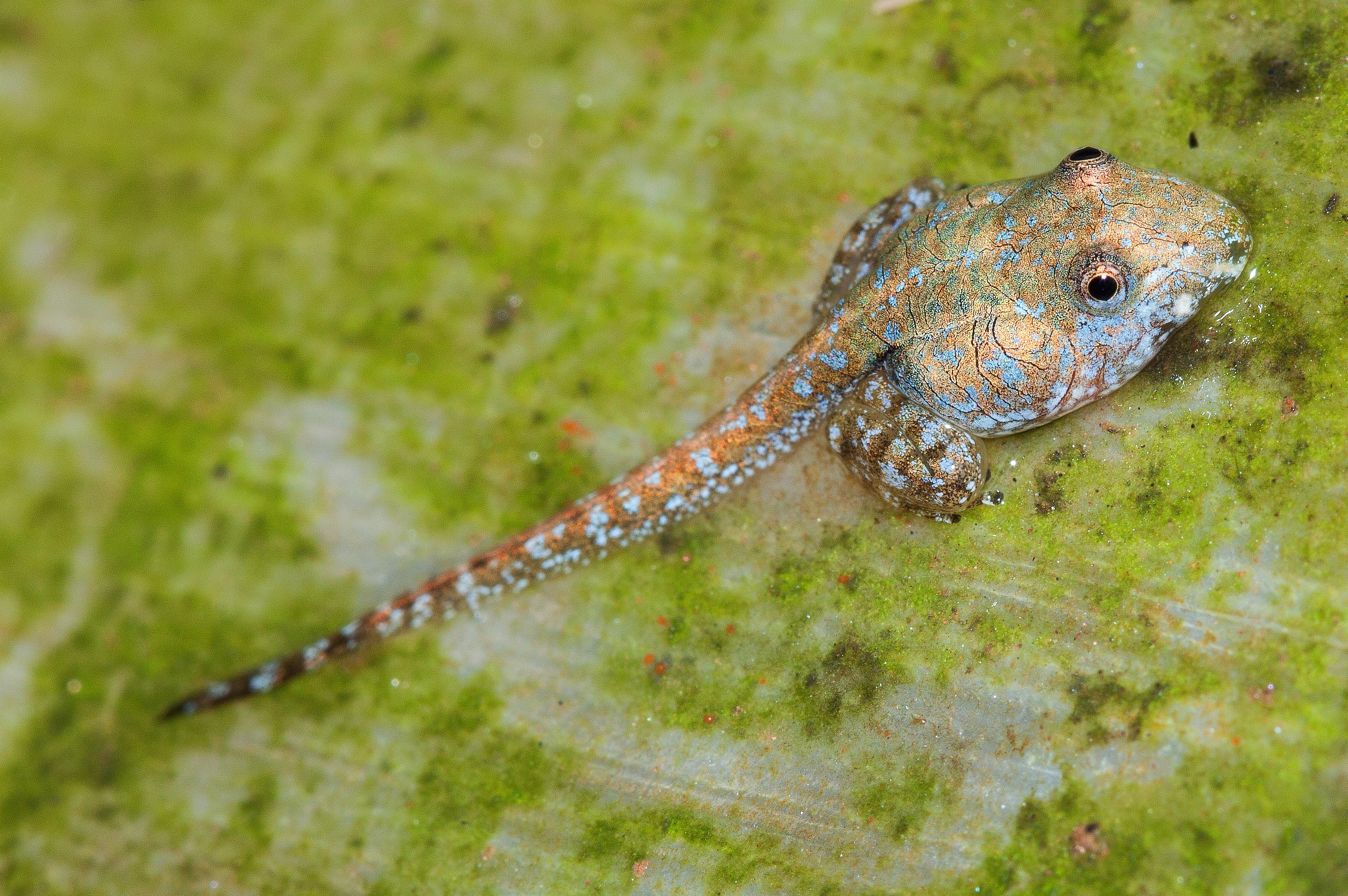
Tadpole

=== Family: Rhacophoridae (tree frogs) ===
==== Genus: Beddomixalus ====
===== Beddomixalus bijui (Kadalar swamp frog) =====
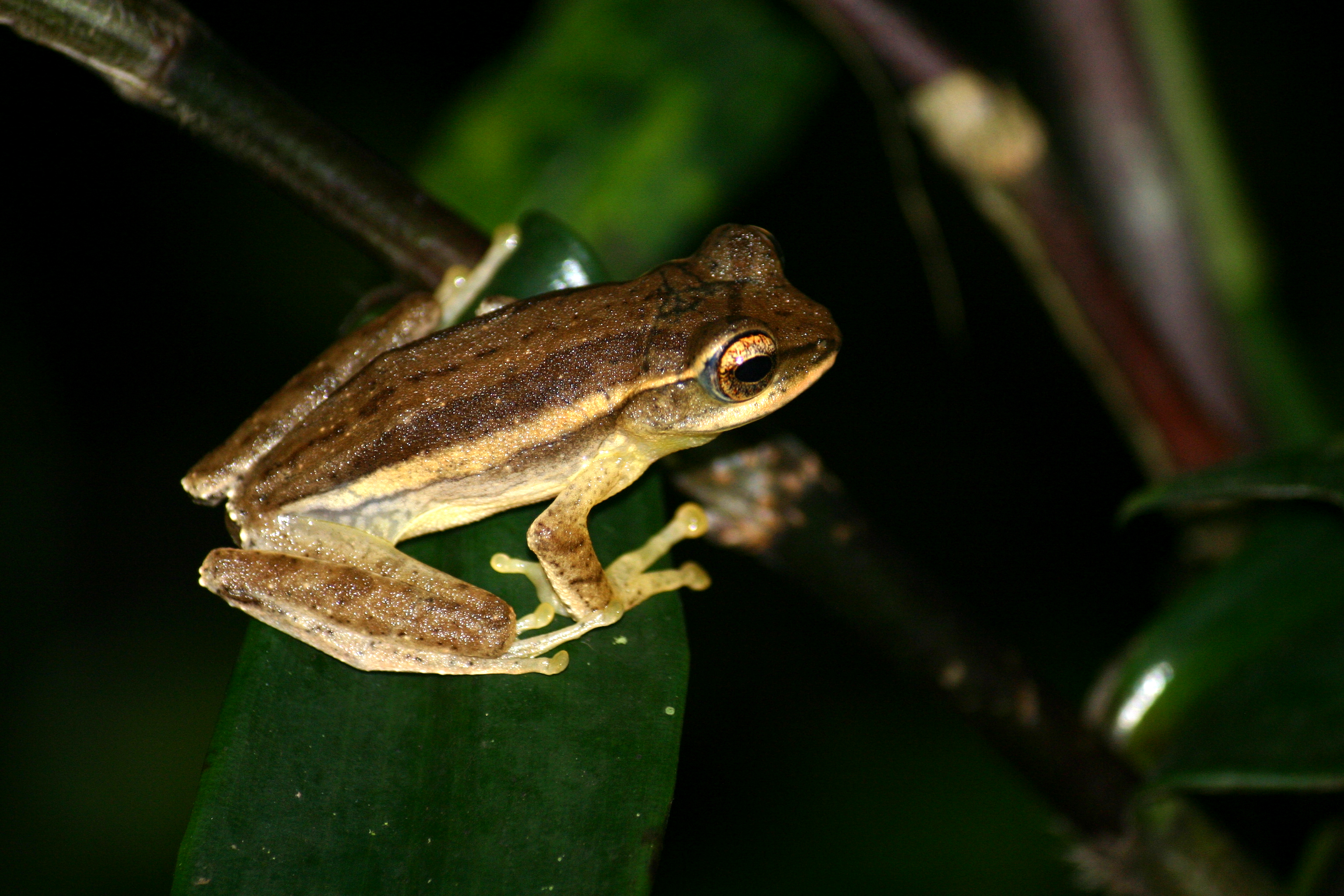
Lateral view

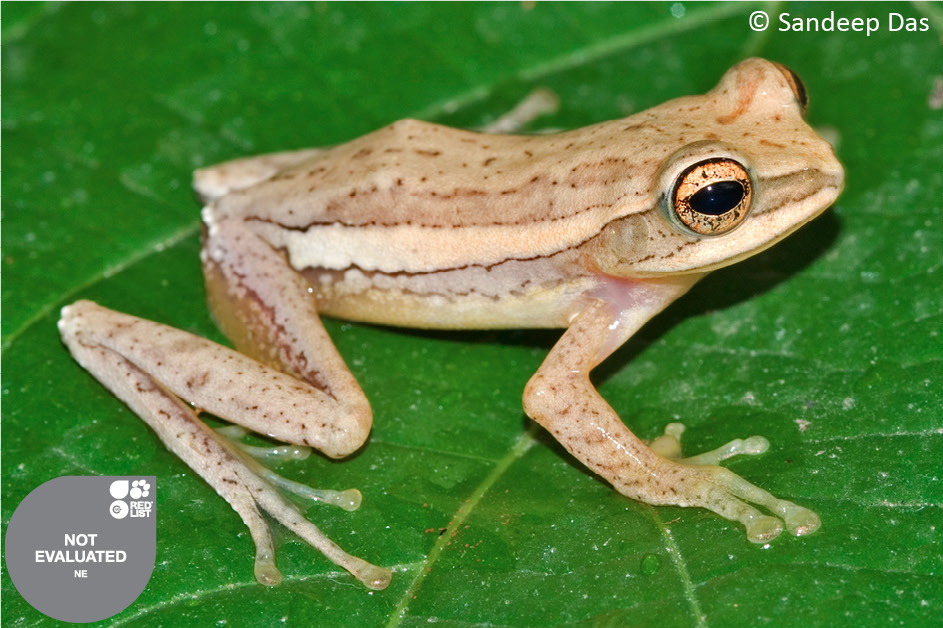
Lateral view

==== Ghatixalus magnus (large-sized Ghat tree frog) ====
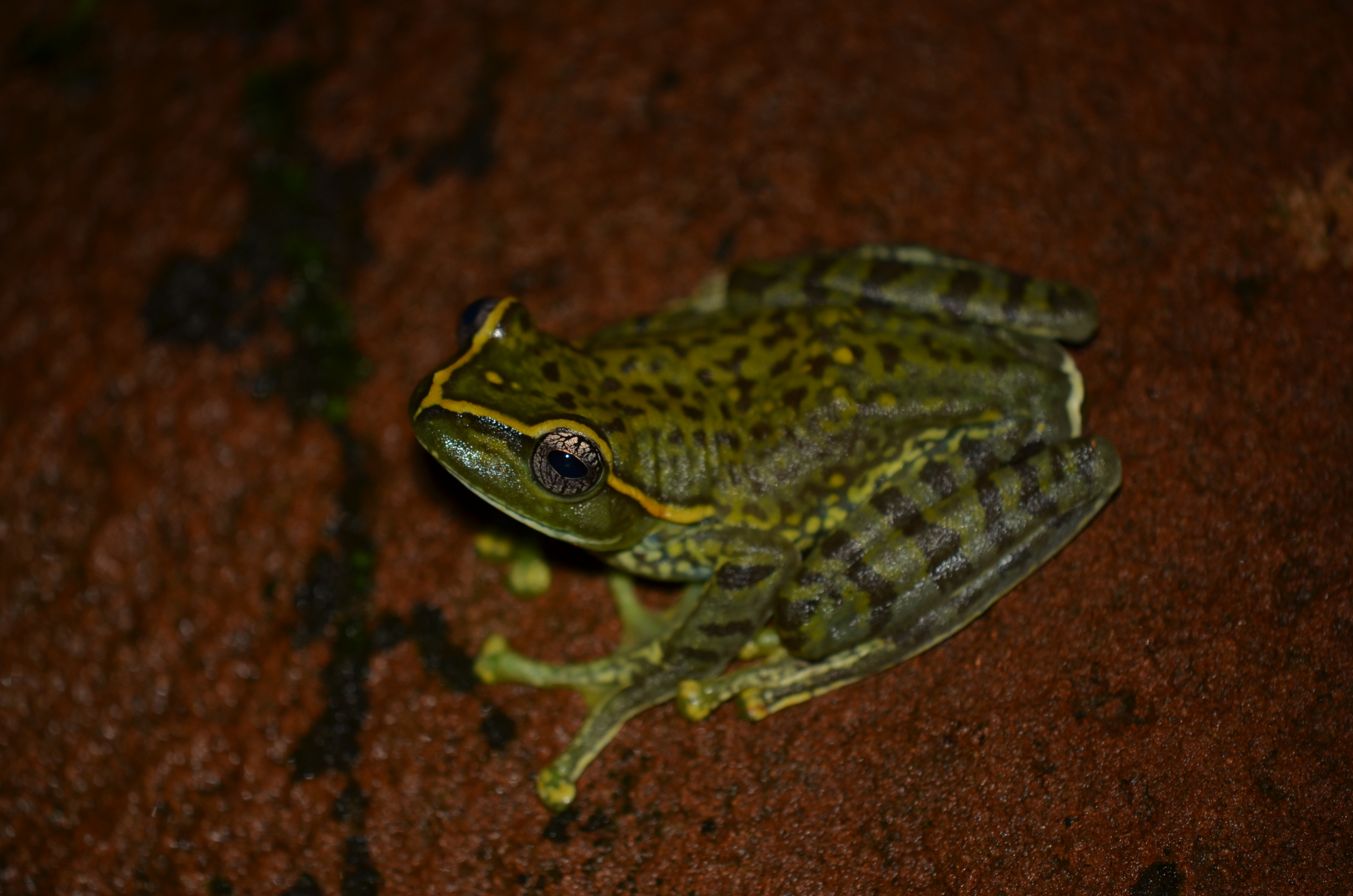
Lateral view

===== Ghatixalus asterops (Ghat tree frog) =====
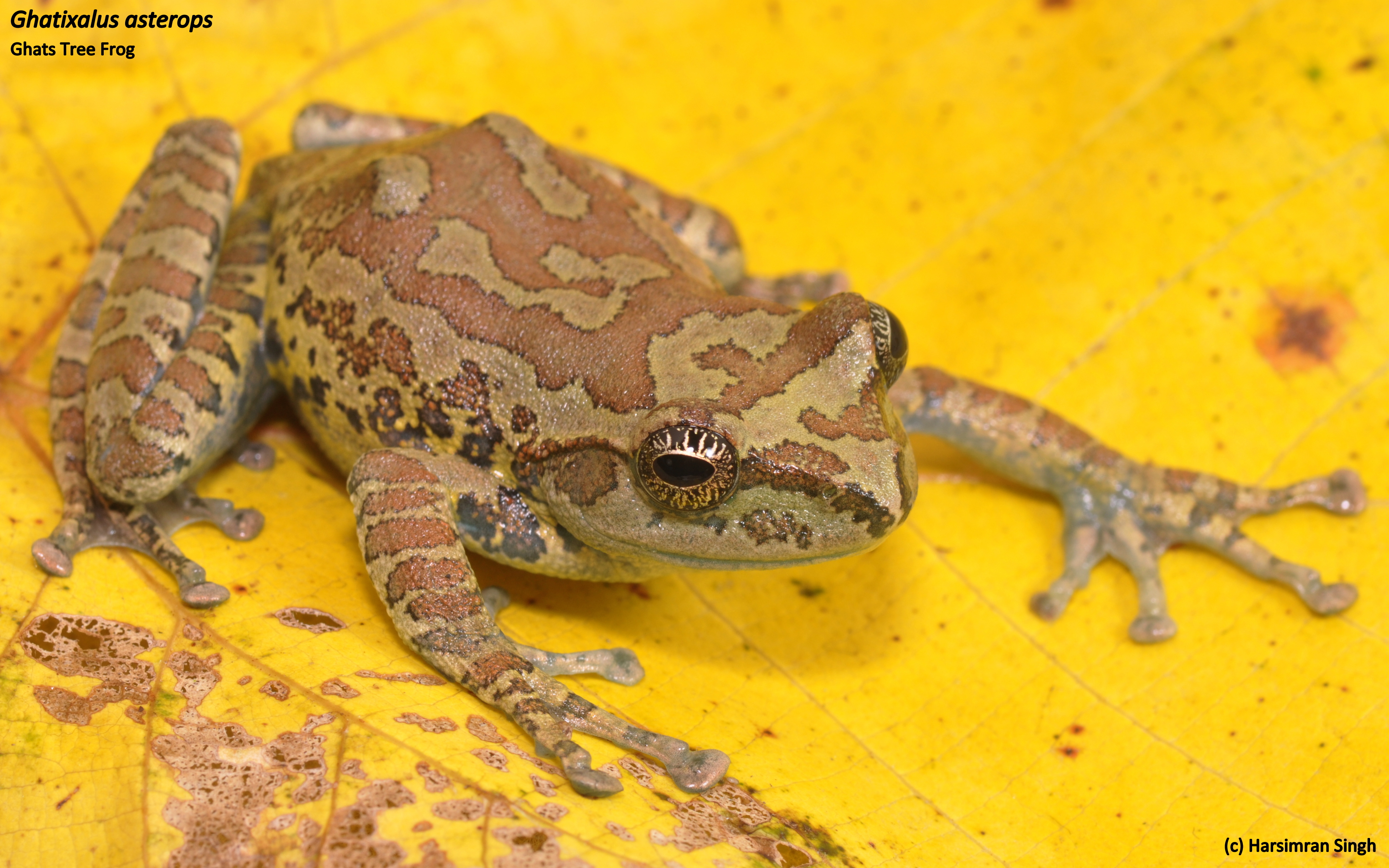
Lateral view

===== Ghatixalus variabilis (green tree frog) =====
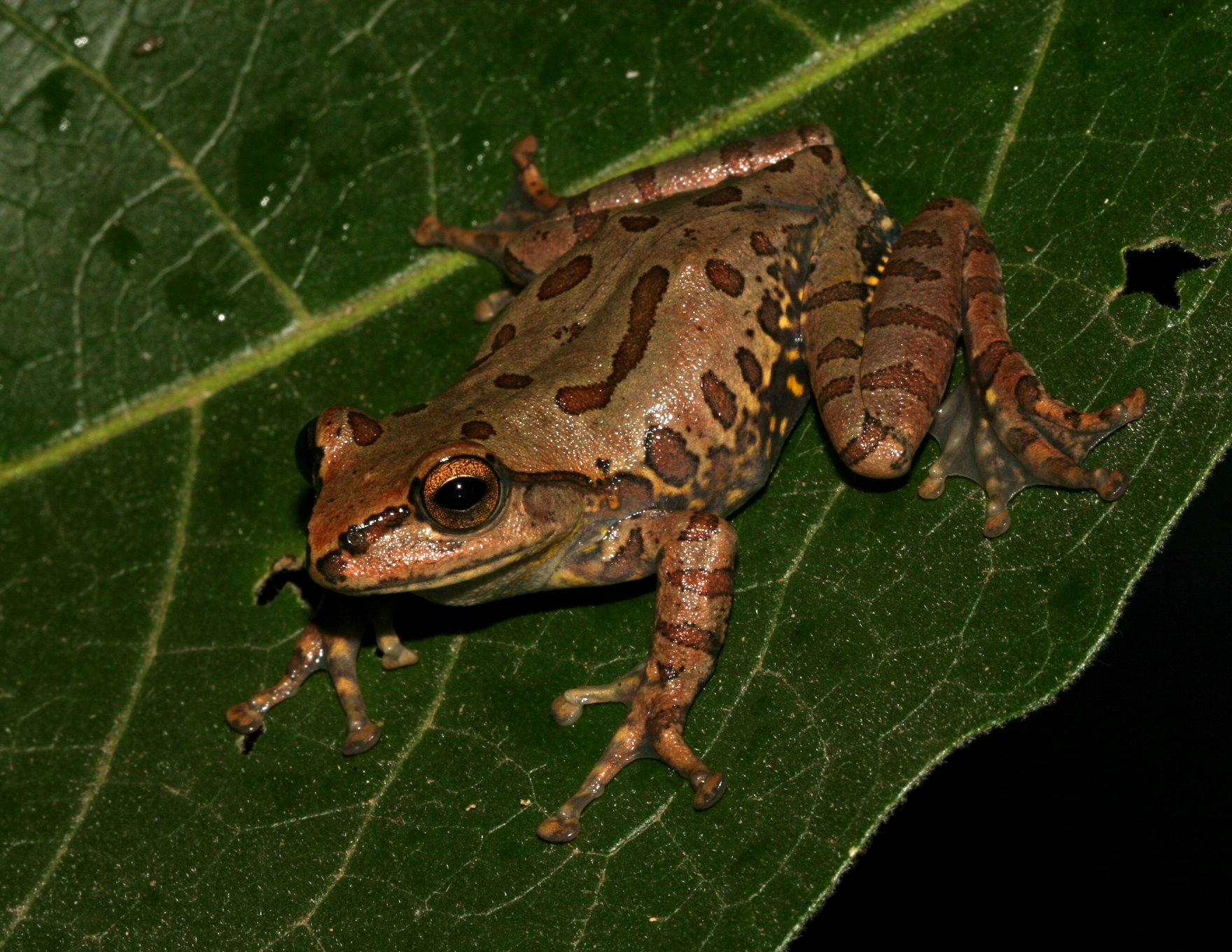
Lateral view

==== Genus: Mercurana ====
===== Mercurana myristicapalustris (Myristica swamp frog) =====
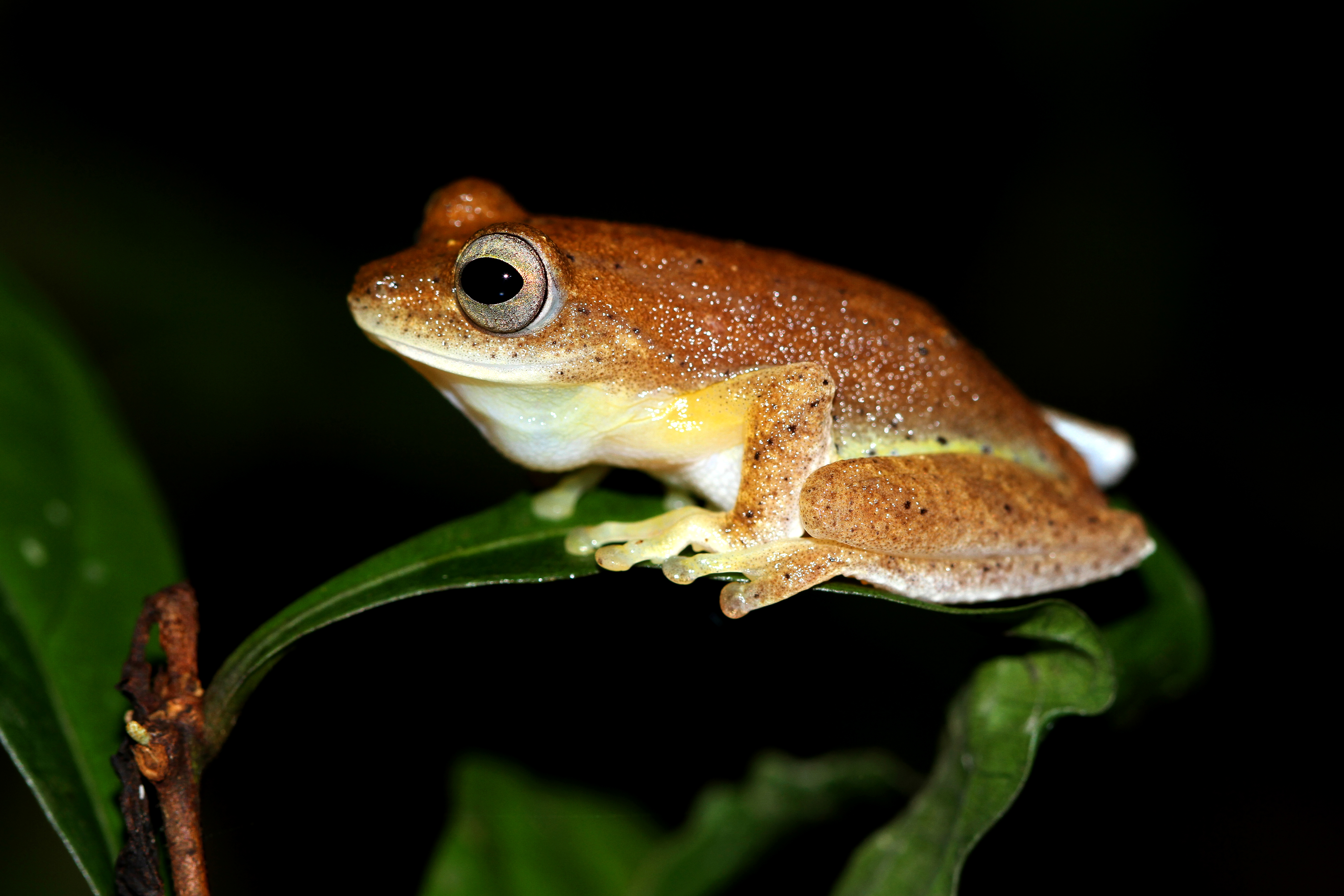
Lateral view

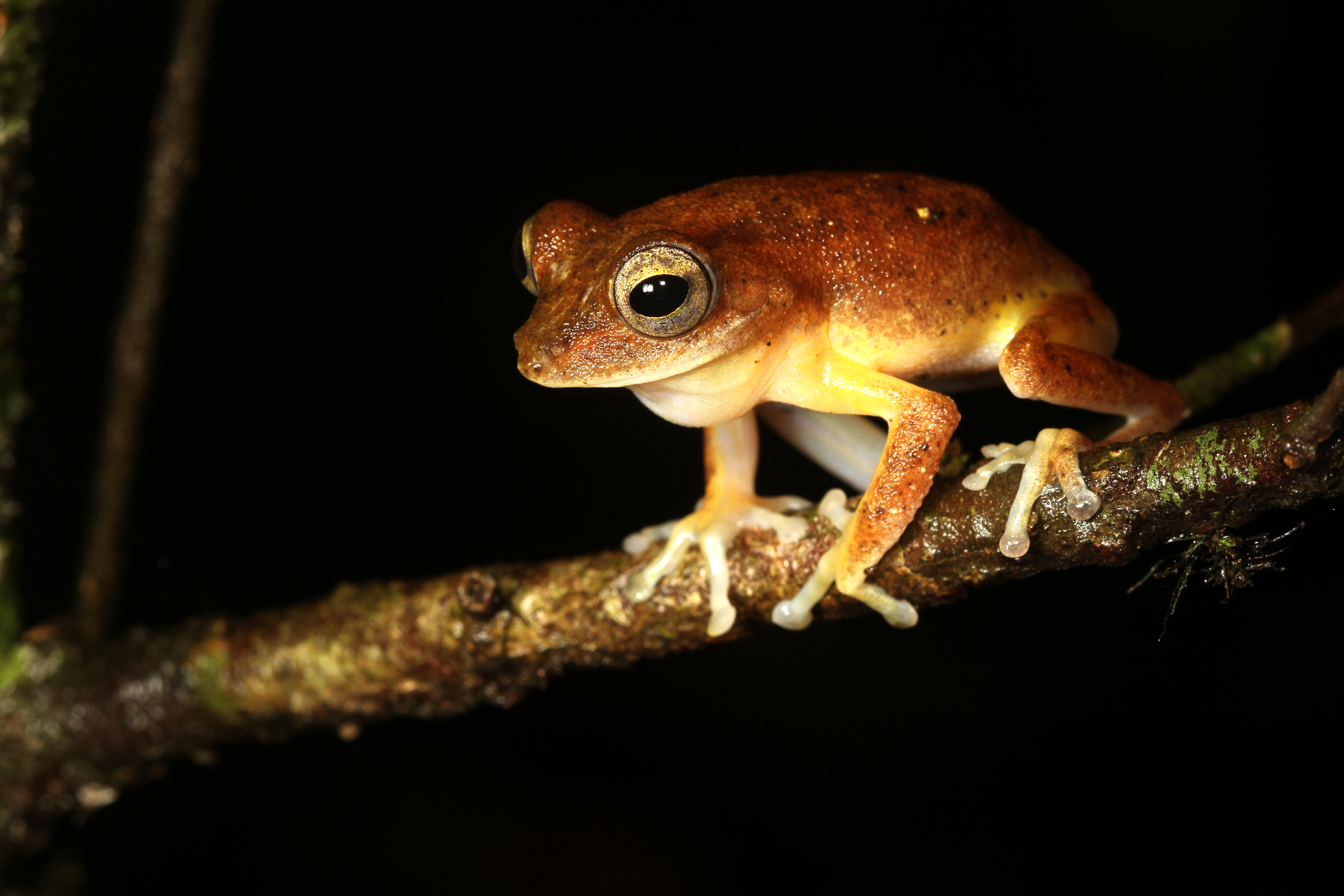
Front view

==== Genus: Polypedates ====
===== Polypedates maculatus (Indian tree frog) =====
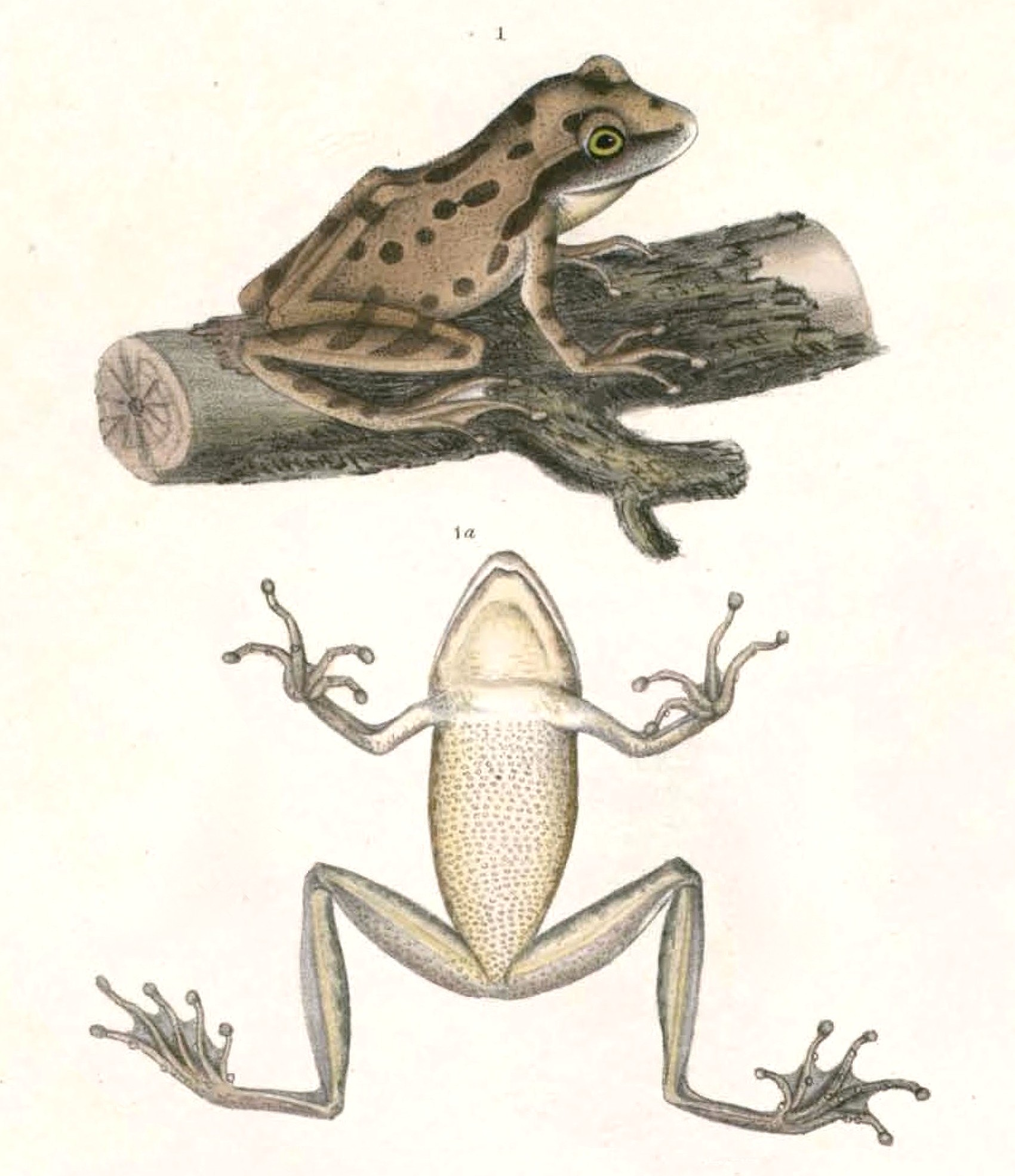
Illustration

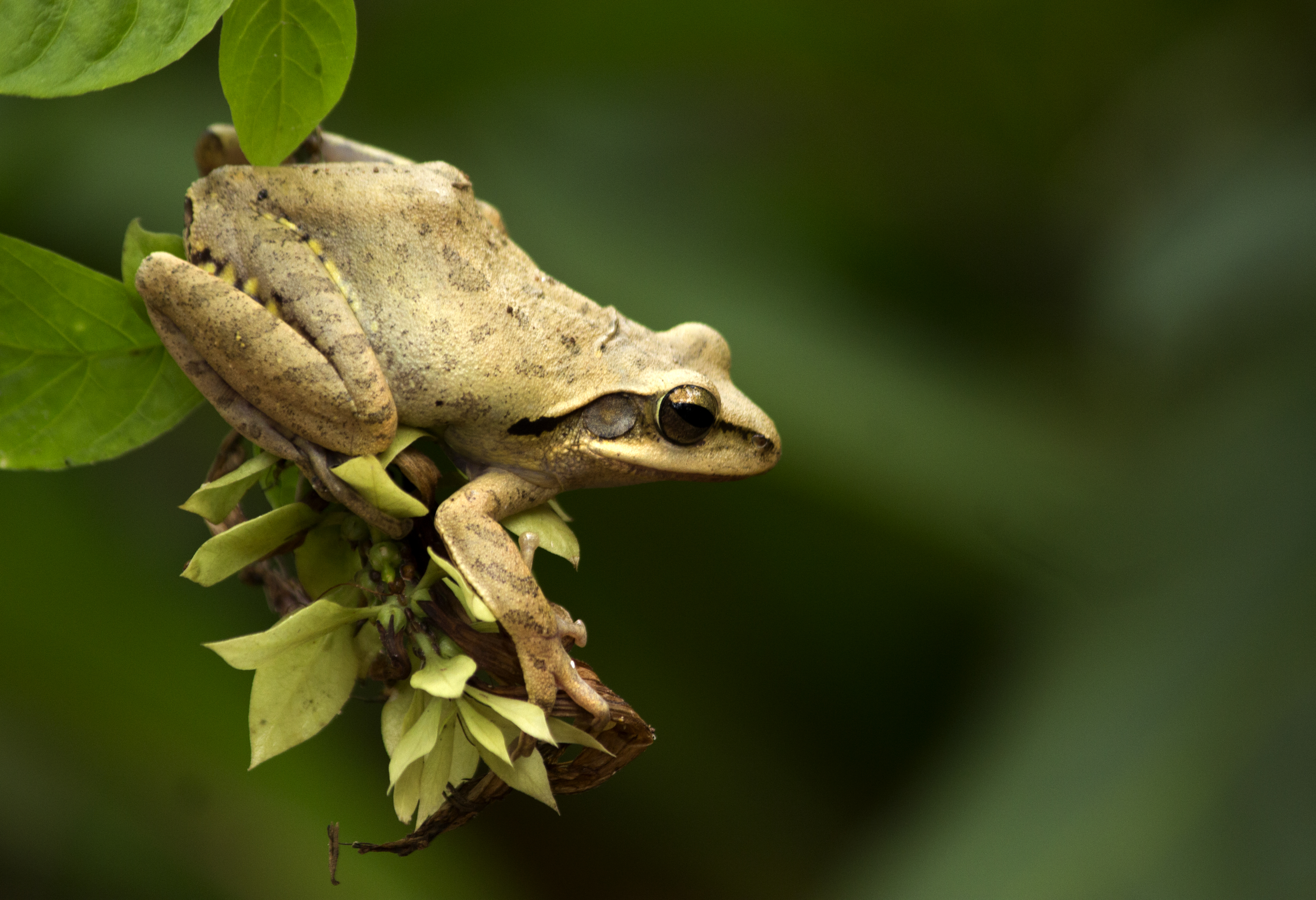
Dorsal view

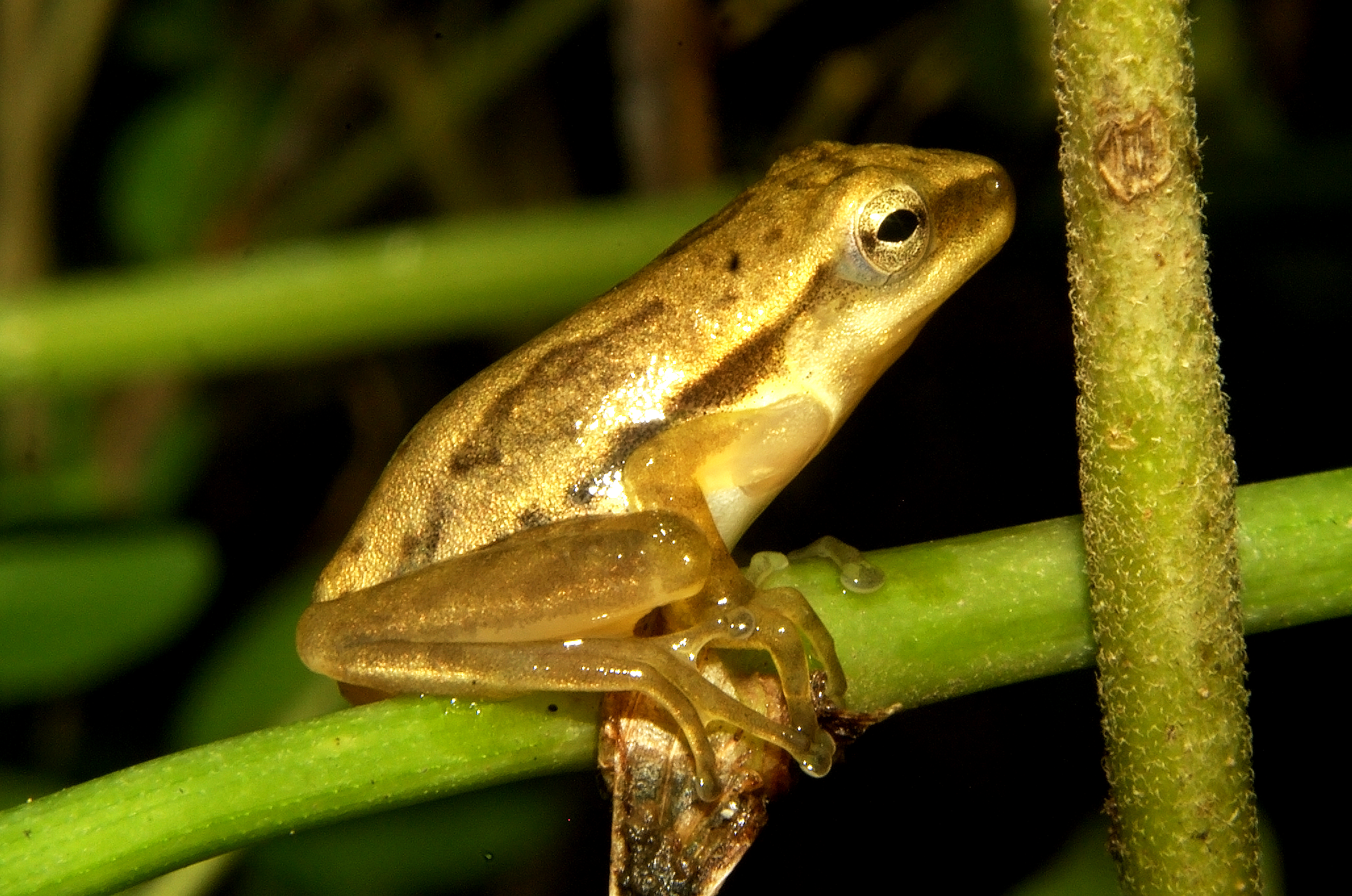
Lateral view

===== Polypedates occidentalis (western/charpa tree frog) =====
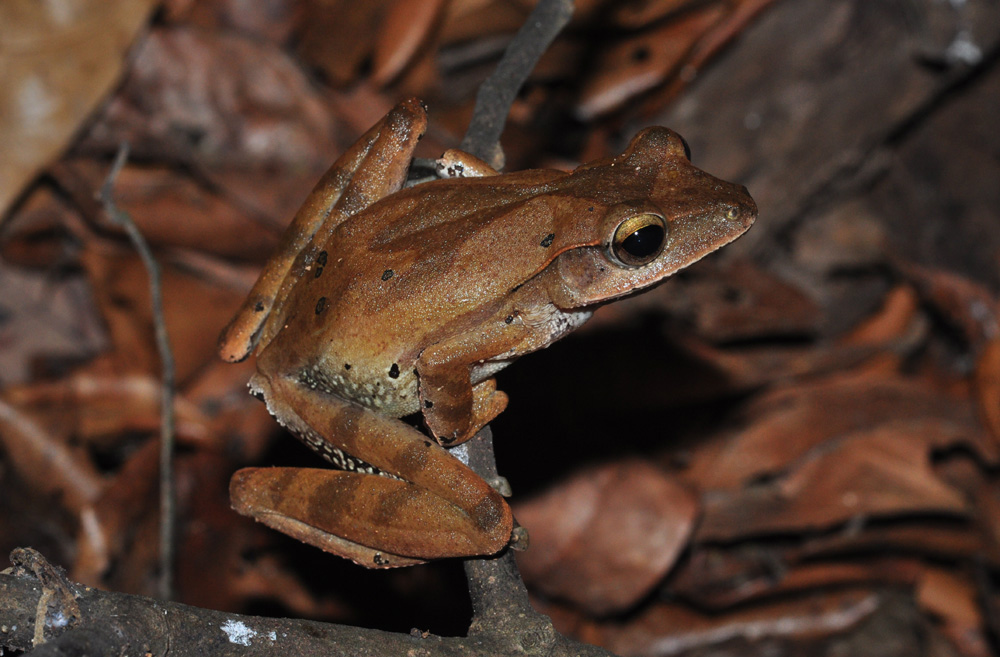
Lateral view

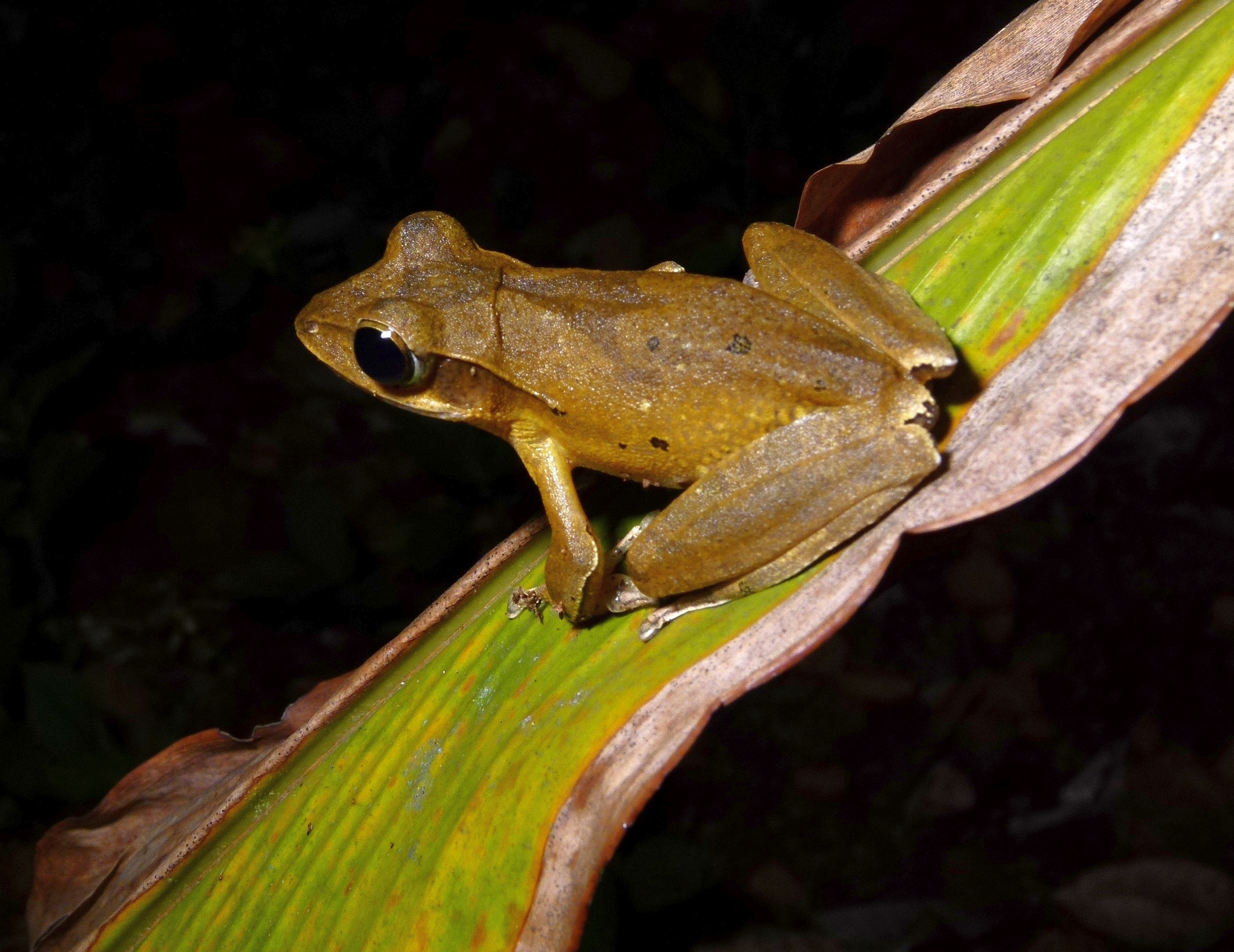
Lateral view

===== Polypedates pseudocruciger (false hour-glass tree frog) =====
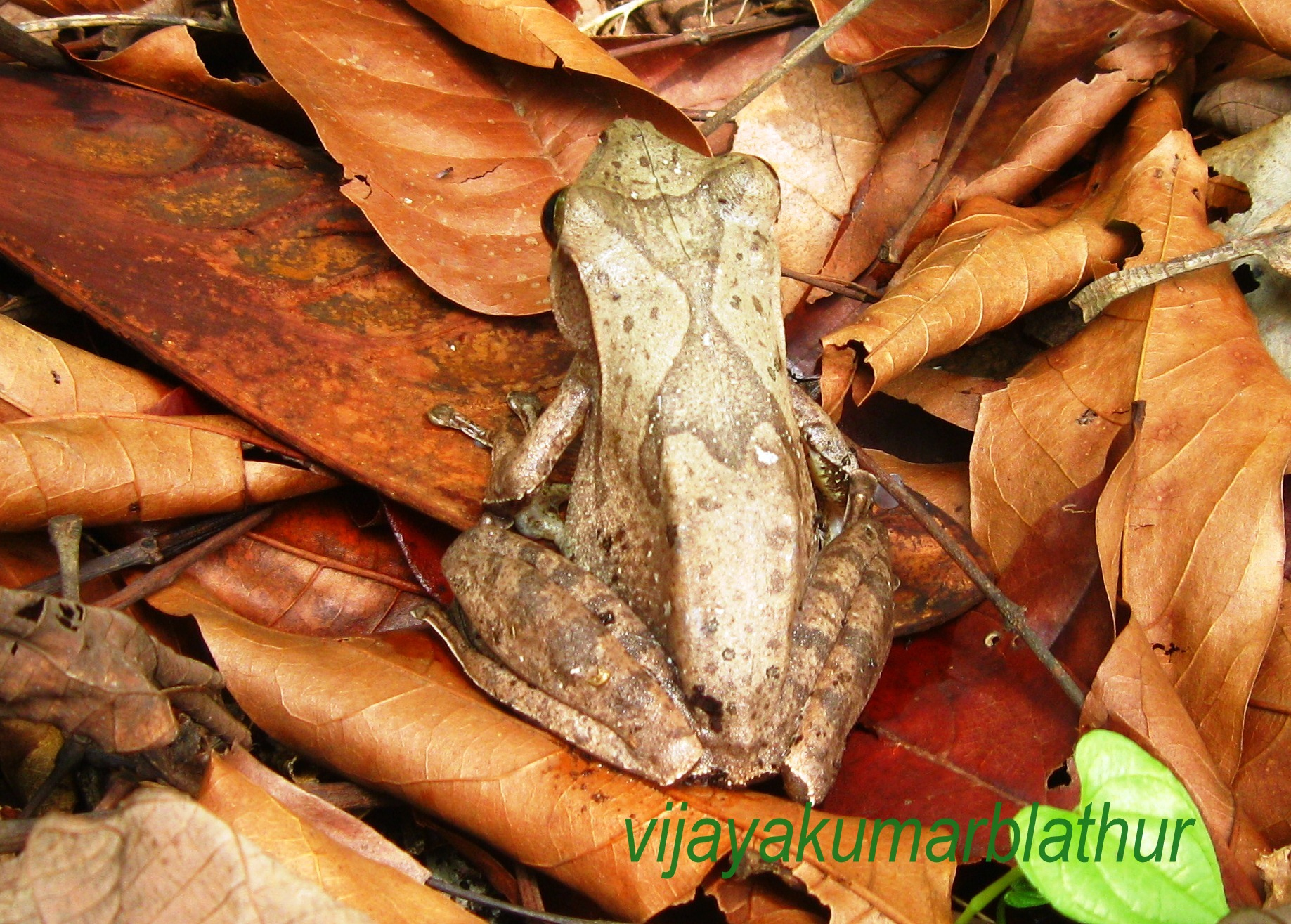
Dorsal view

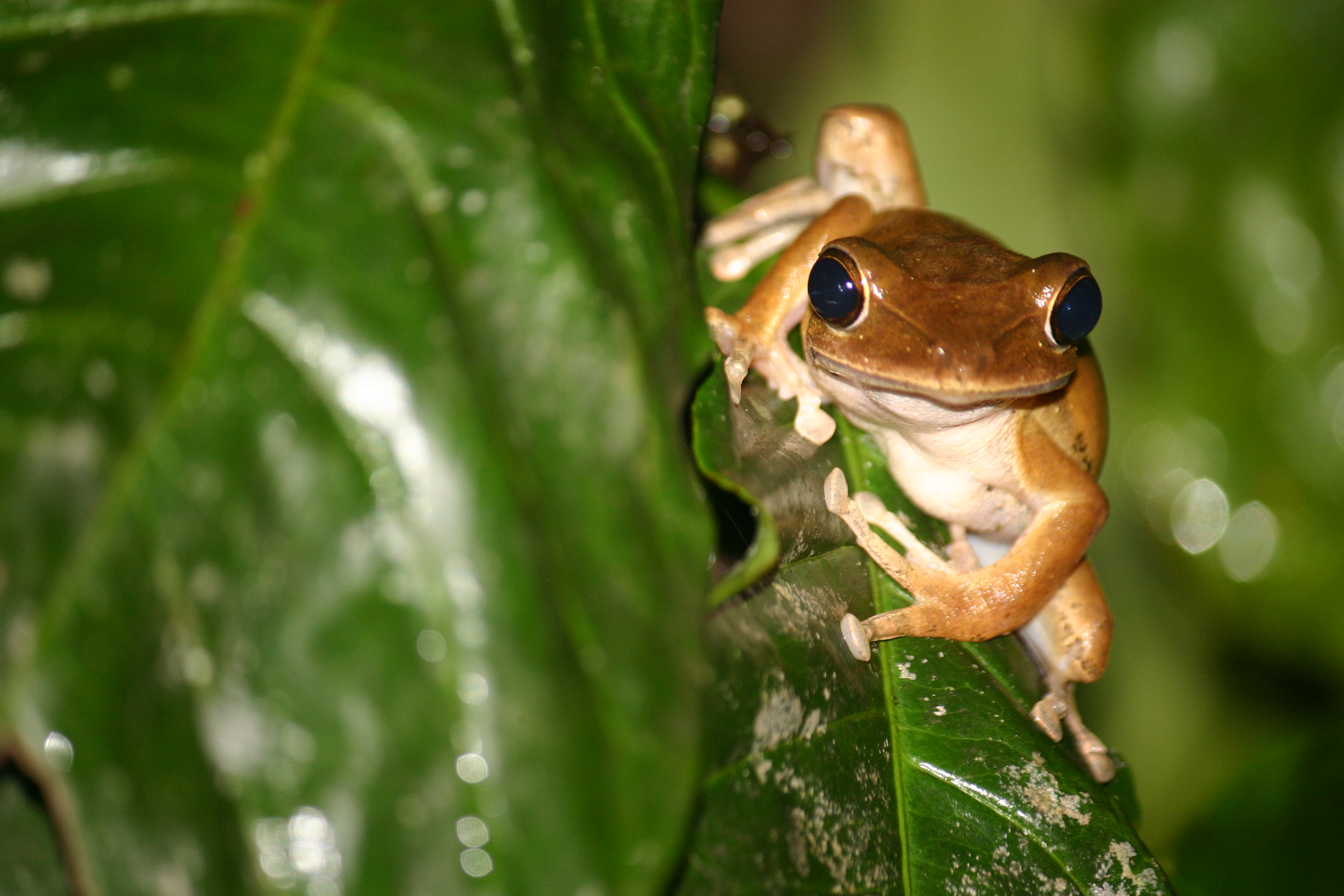
Front view

==== Genus: Pseudophilautus ====
===== Pseudophilautus kani (kani bush frog) =====
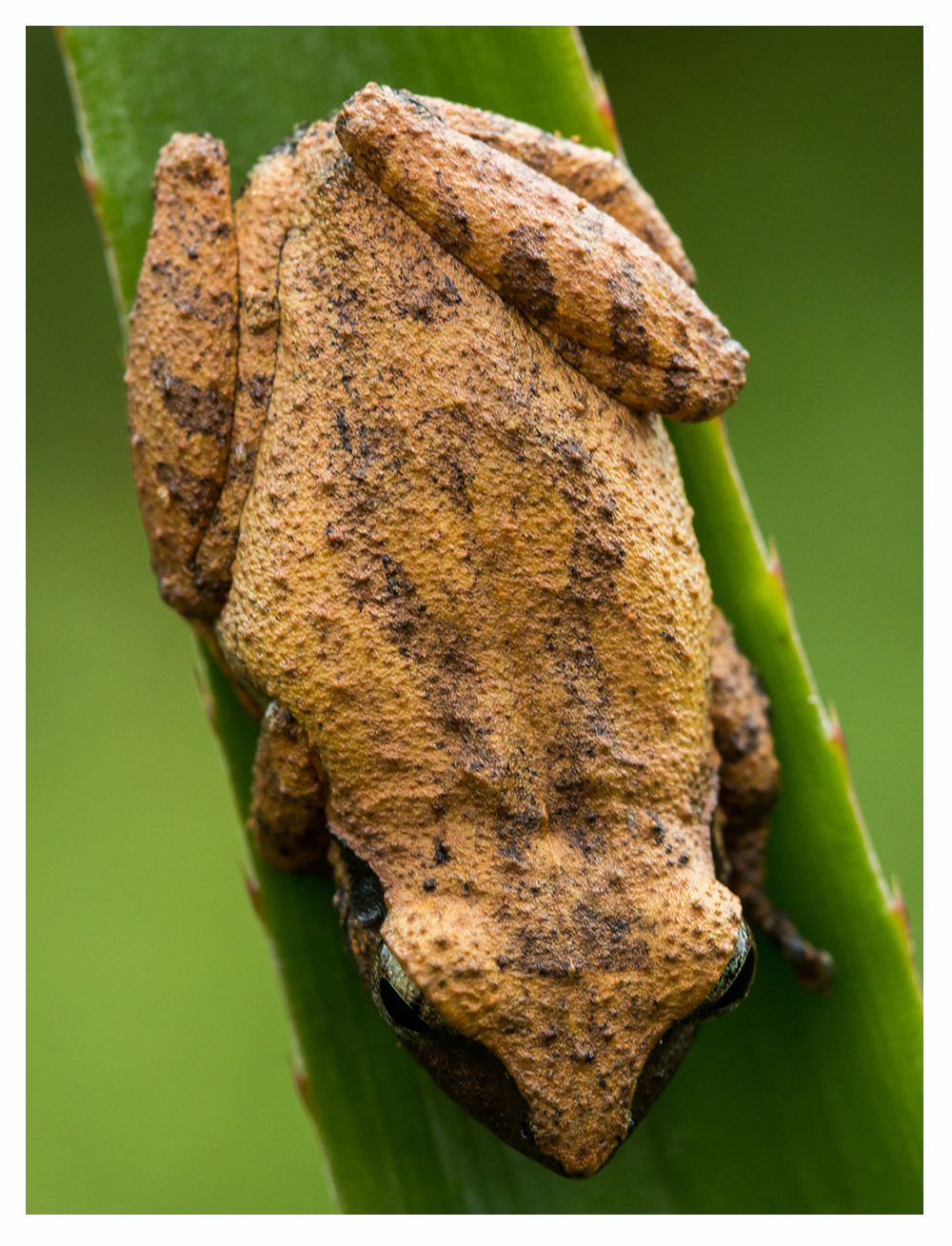
Dorsal view

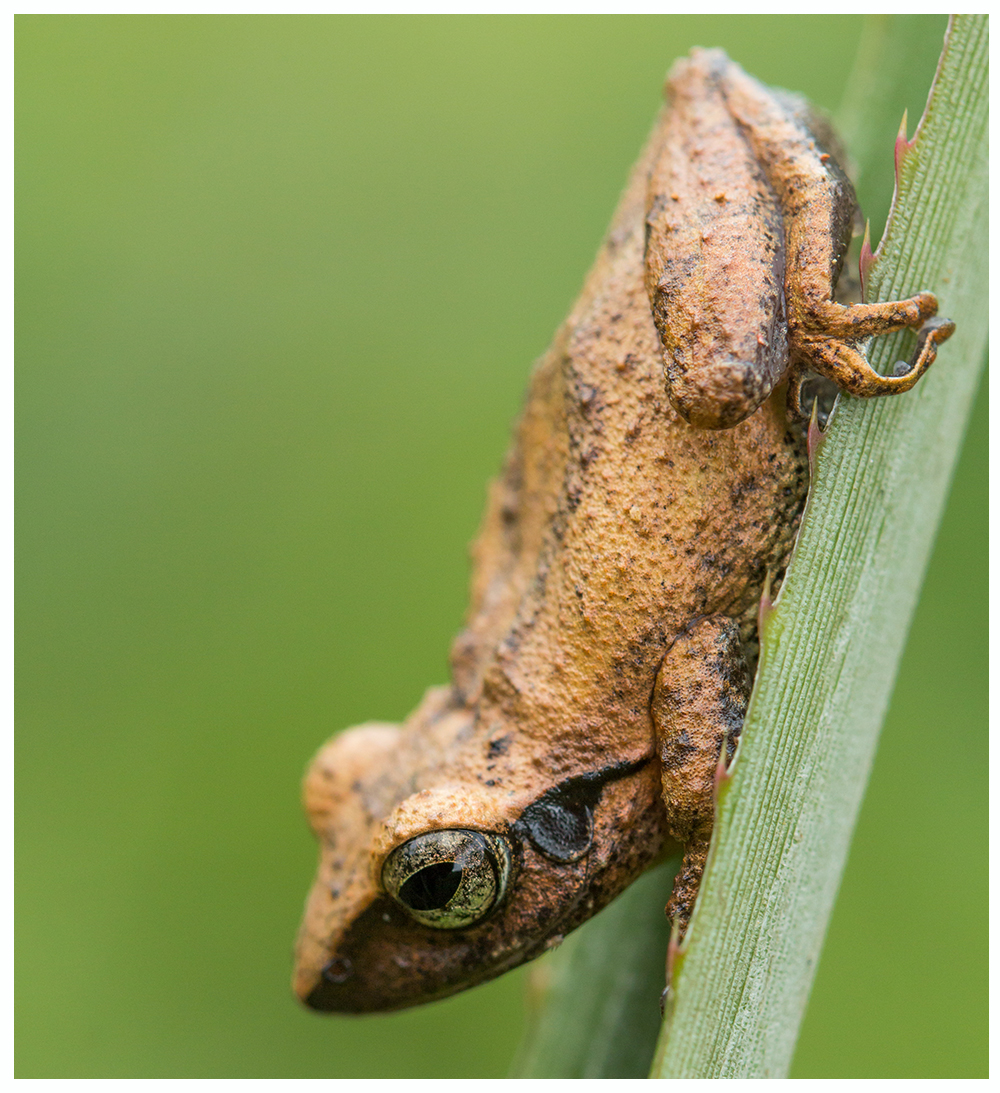
Lateral view

===== Pseudophilautus wynaadensis (Waynad bush frog) =====
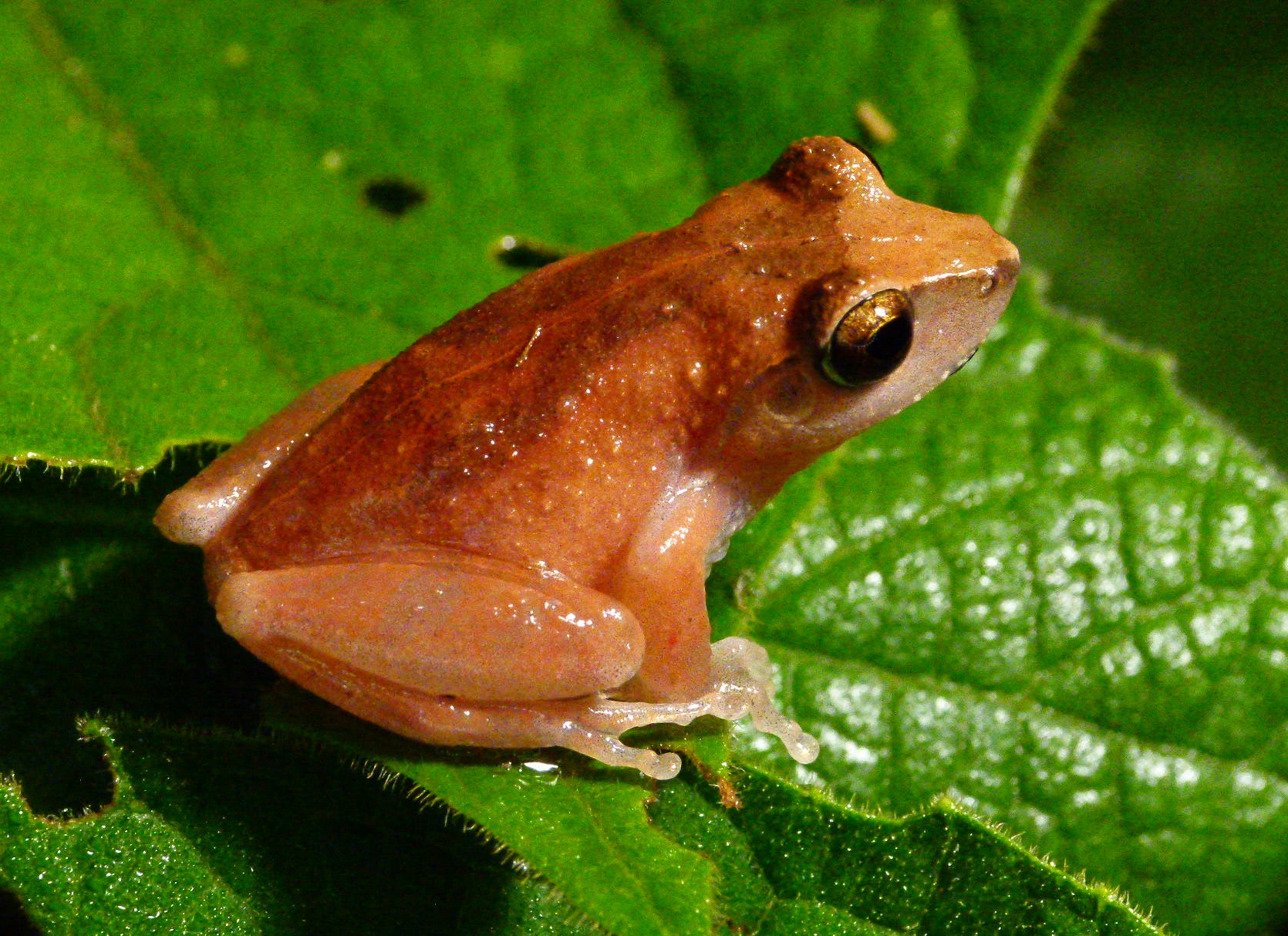
Dorsal view

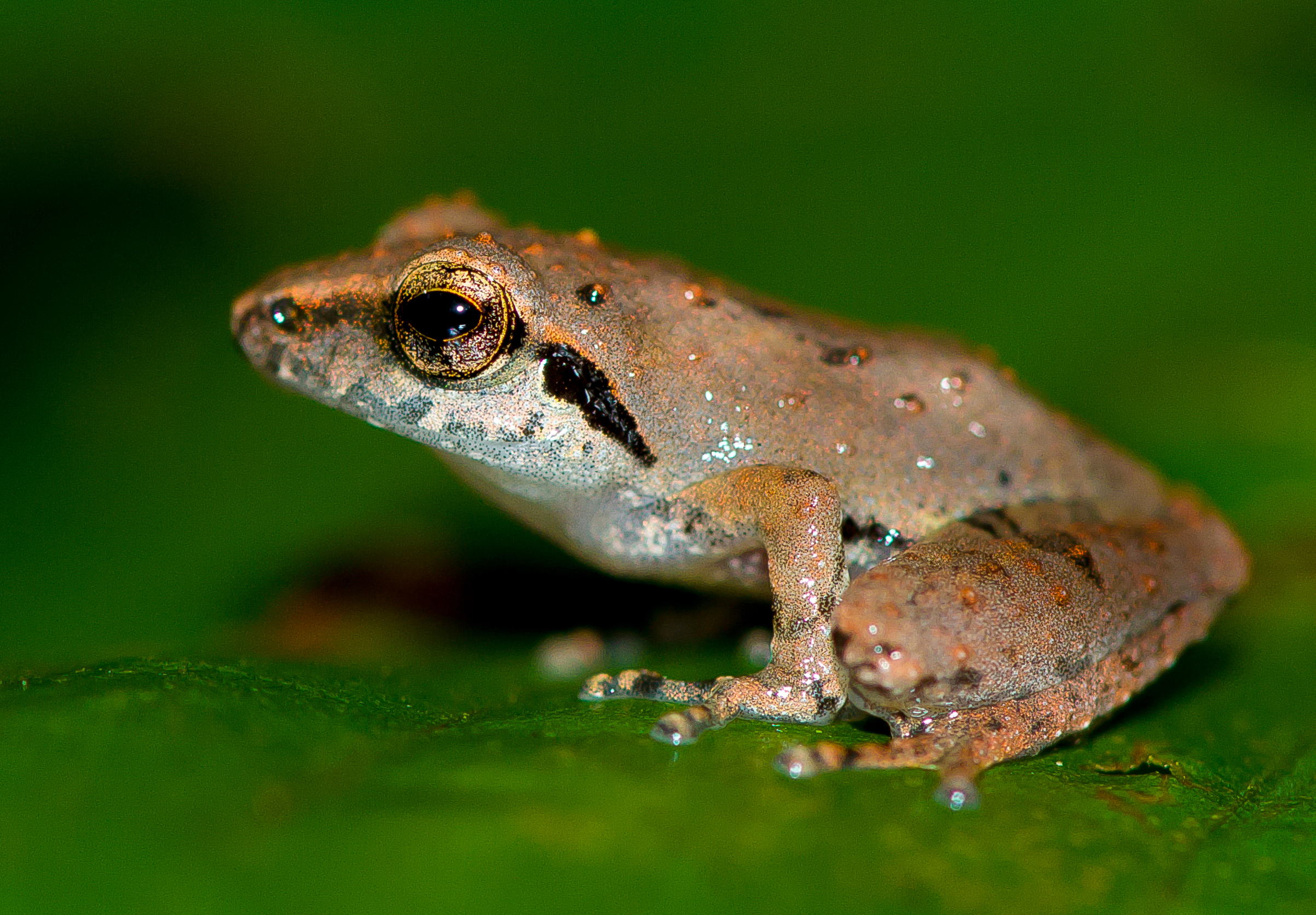
Lateral view

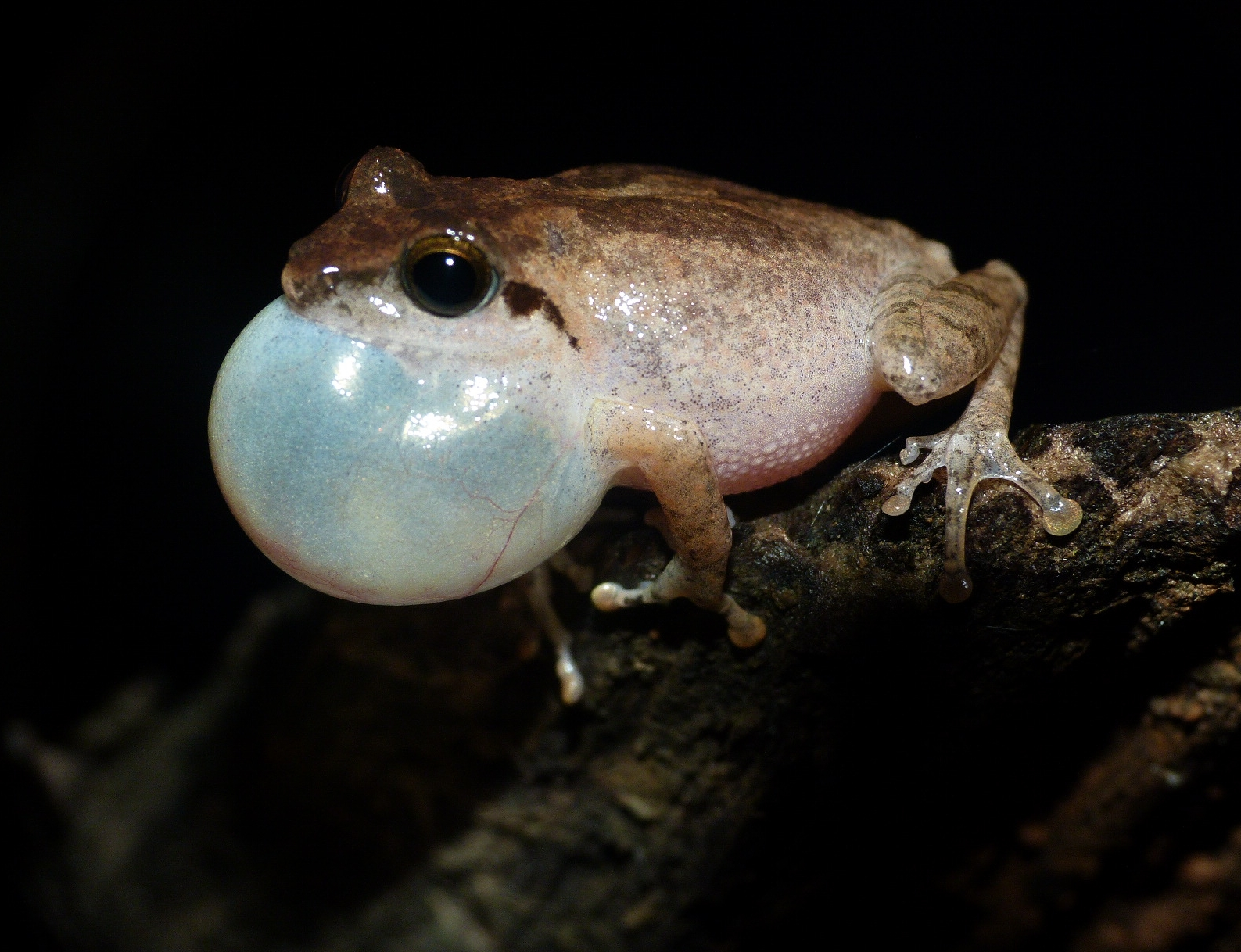
Calling

==== Genus: Raorchestes ====
===== Raorchestes agasthyaensis (Agasthiamalai bush frog) =====
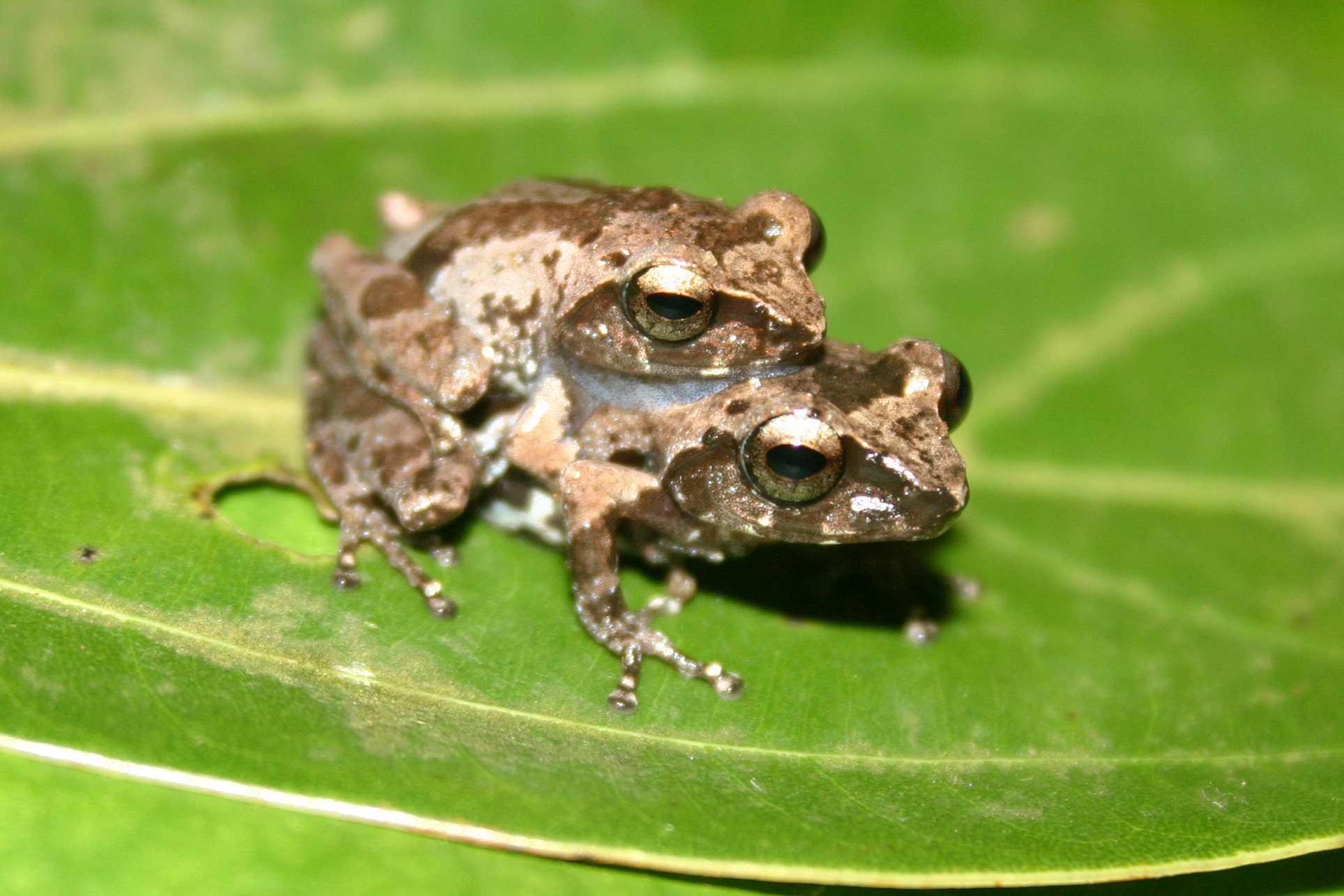
Amplexus

===== Raorchestes akroparallagi (variable bush frog) =====
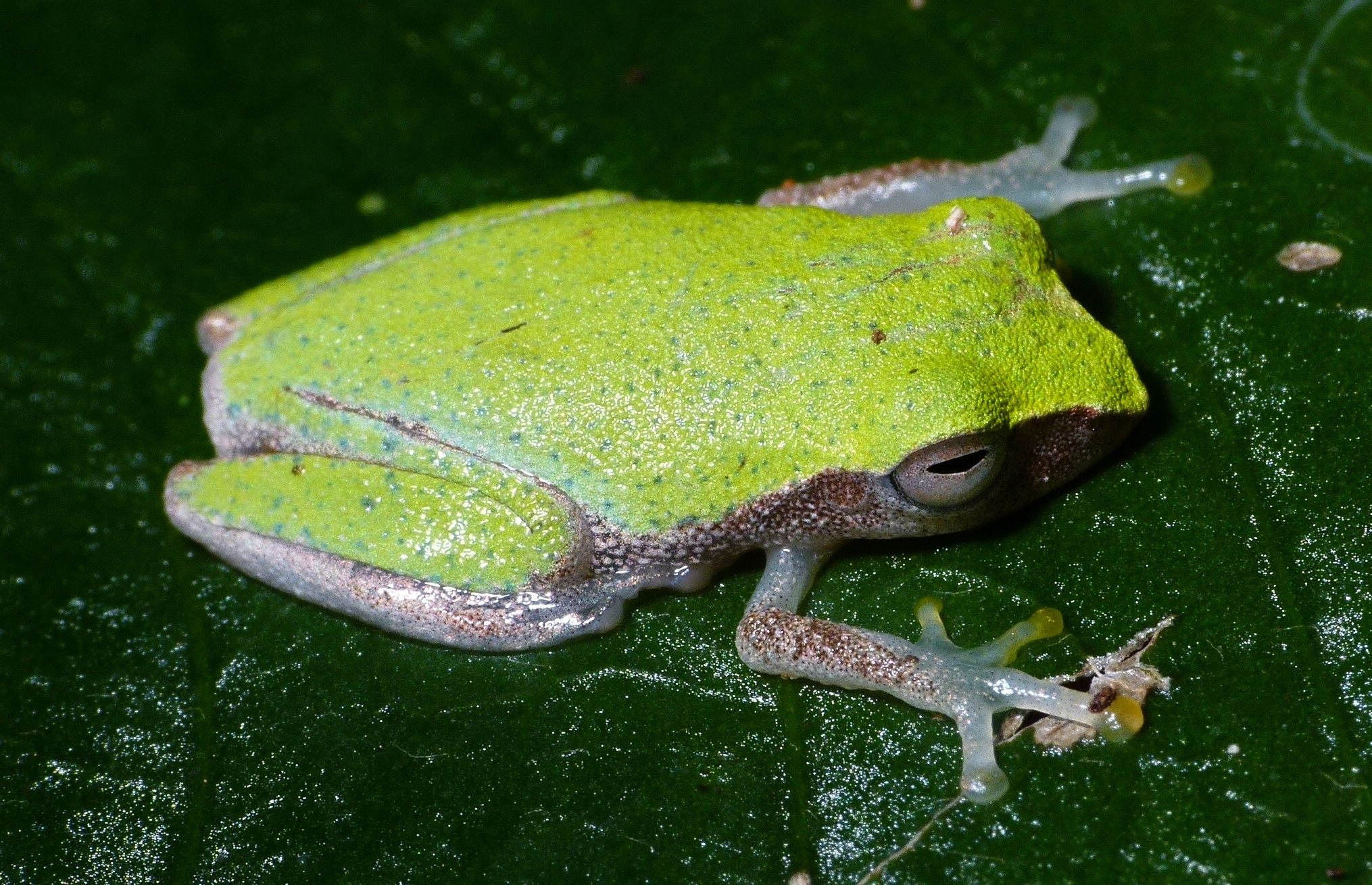
Dorsal view

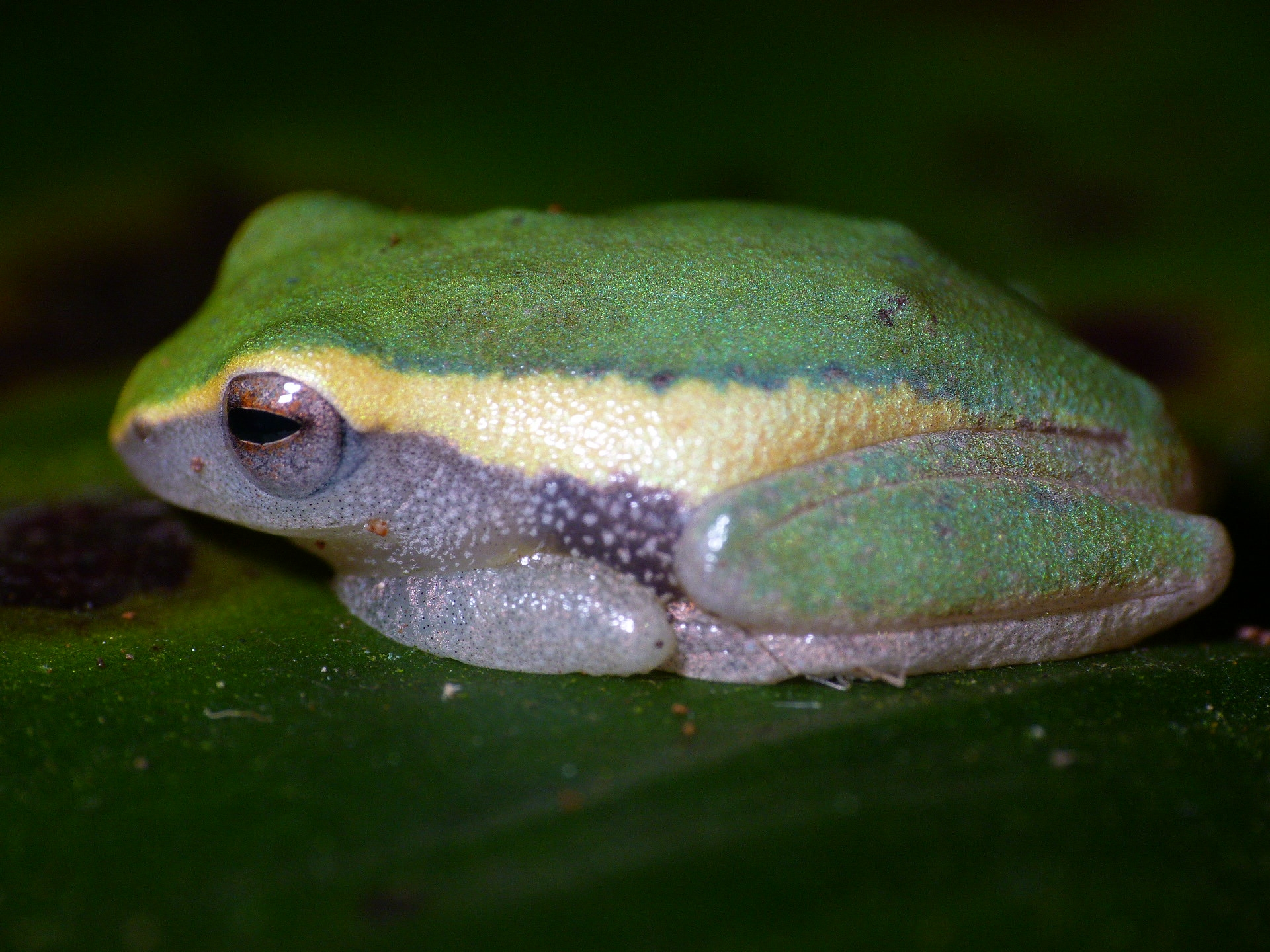
Lateral view

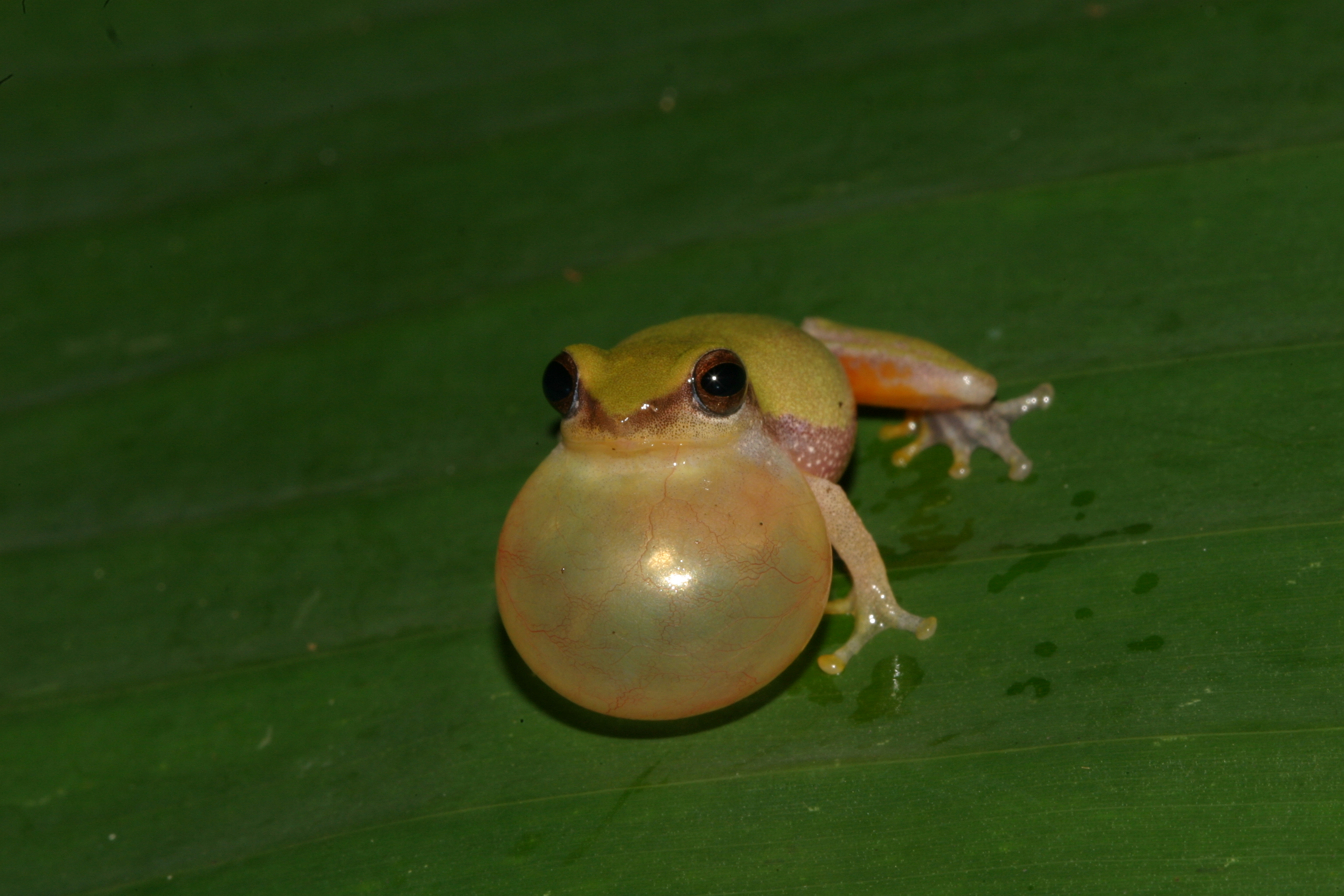
Calling

===== Raorchestes anili (Anil's bush frog) =====
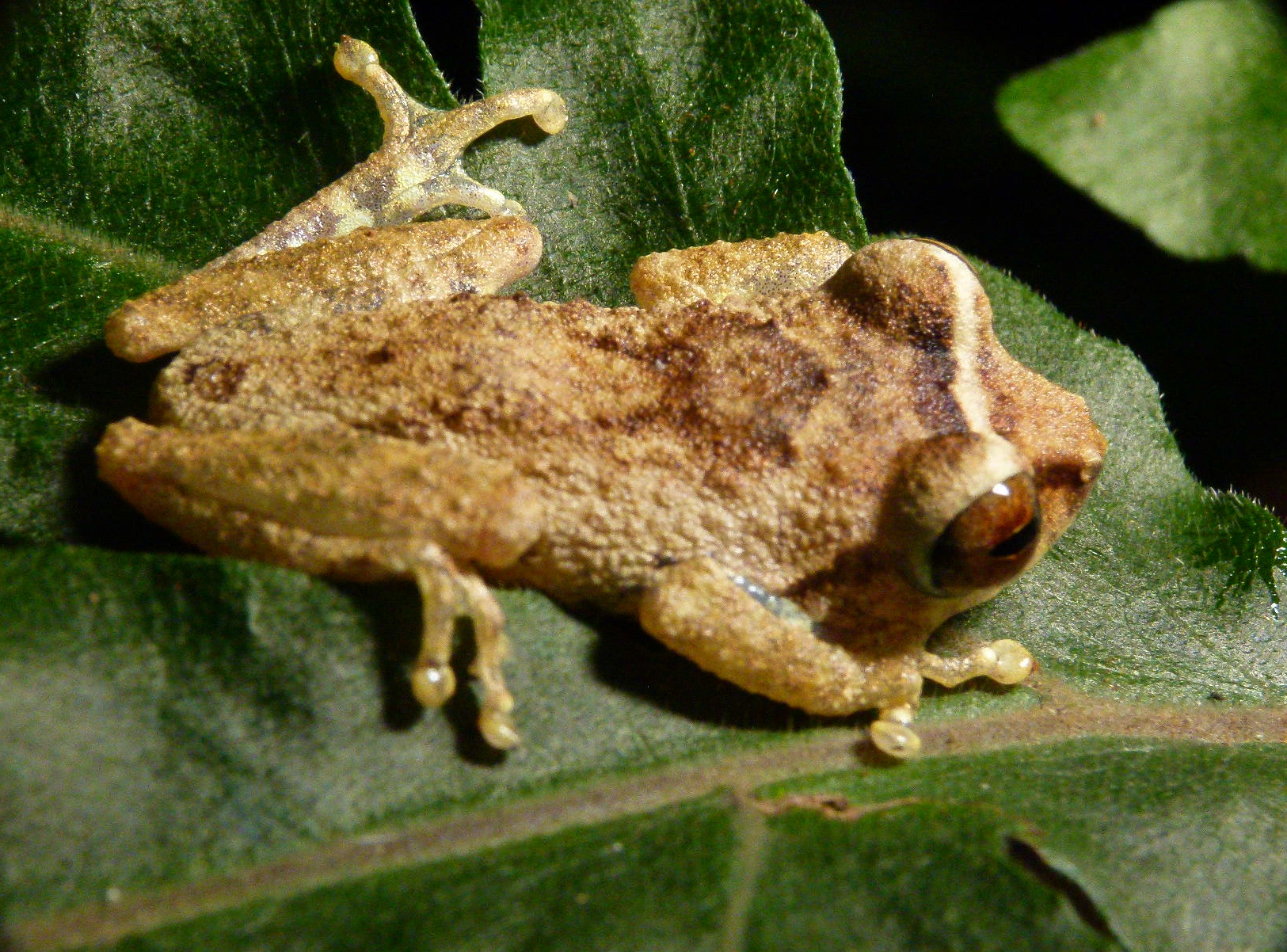
Dorsal view

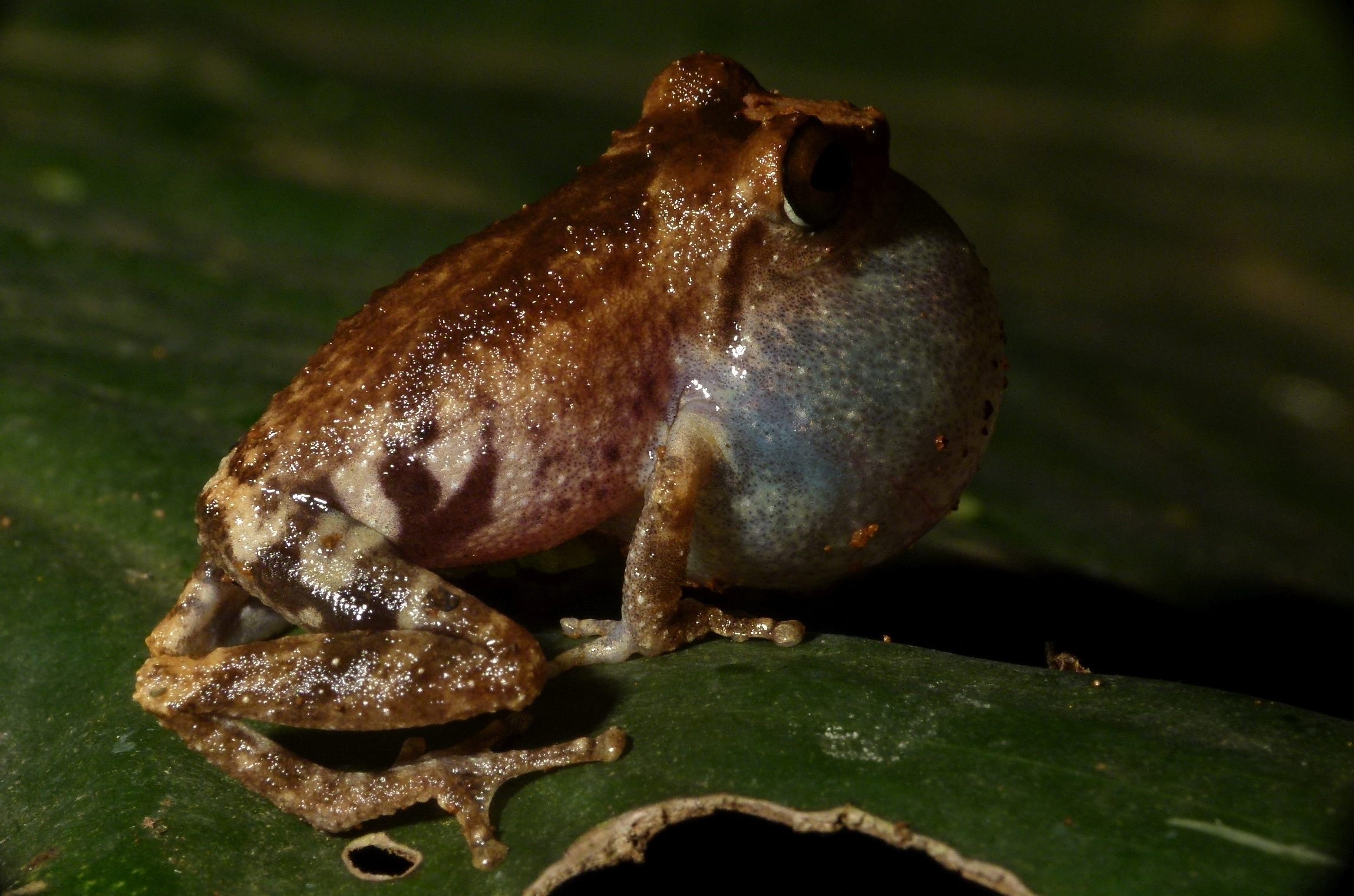
Calling

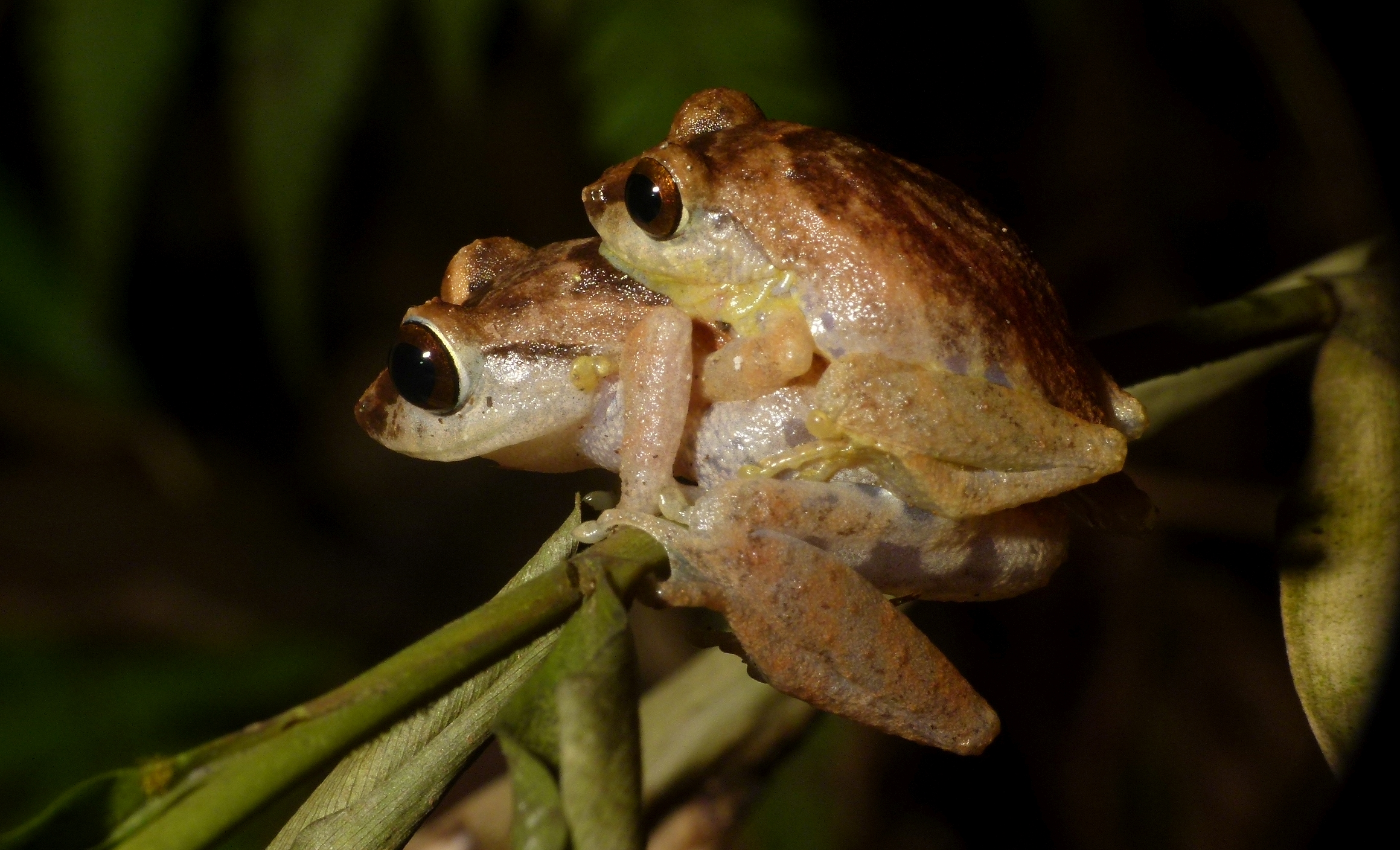
Mating

===== Raorchestes archeos (archaic bush frog) =====
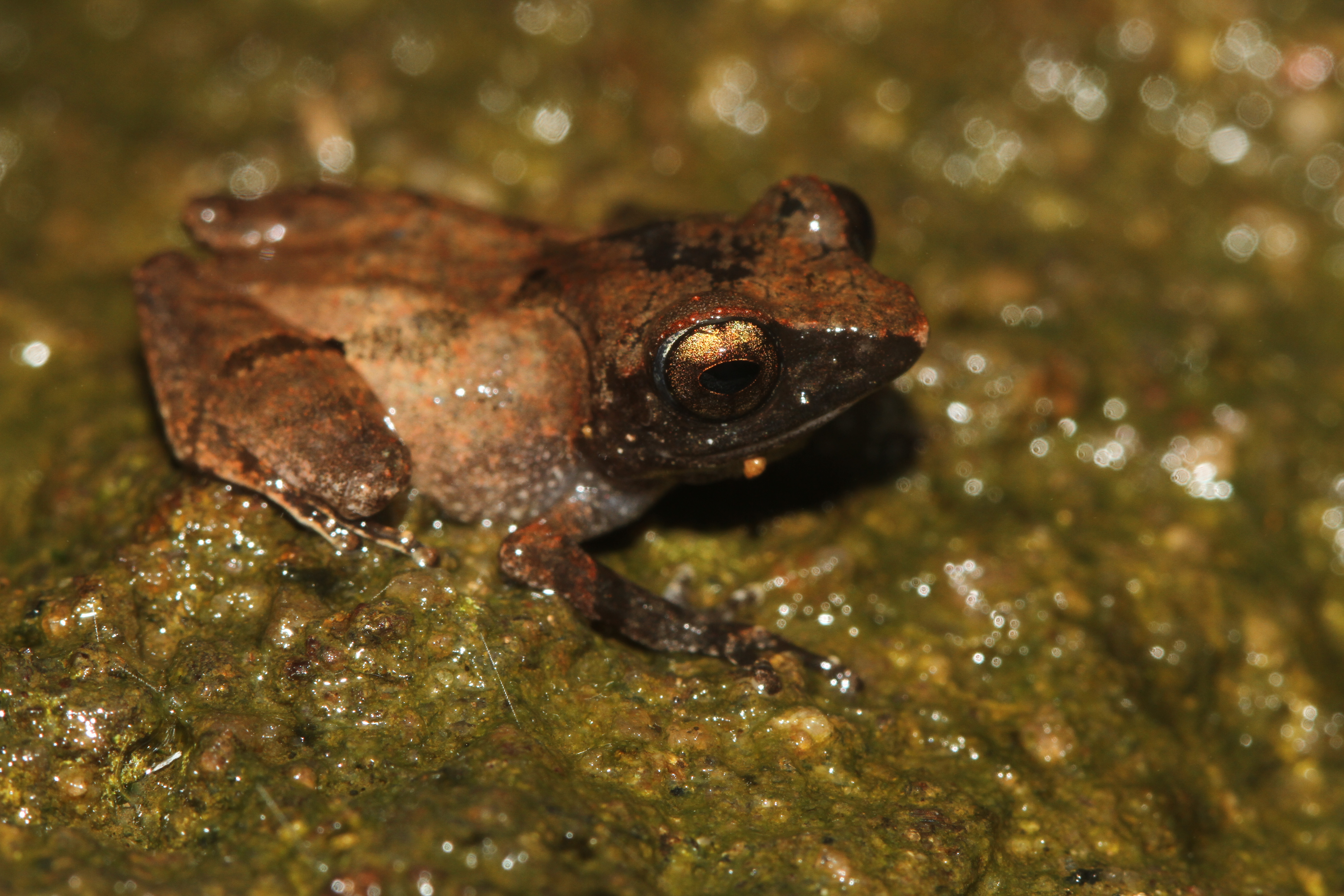
Lateral view

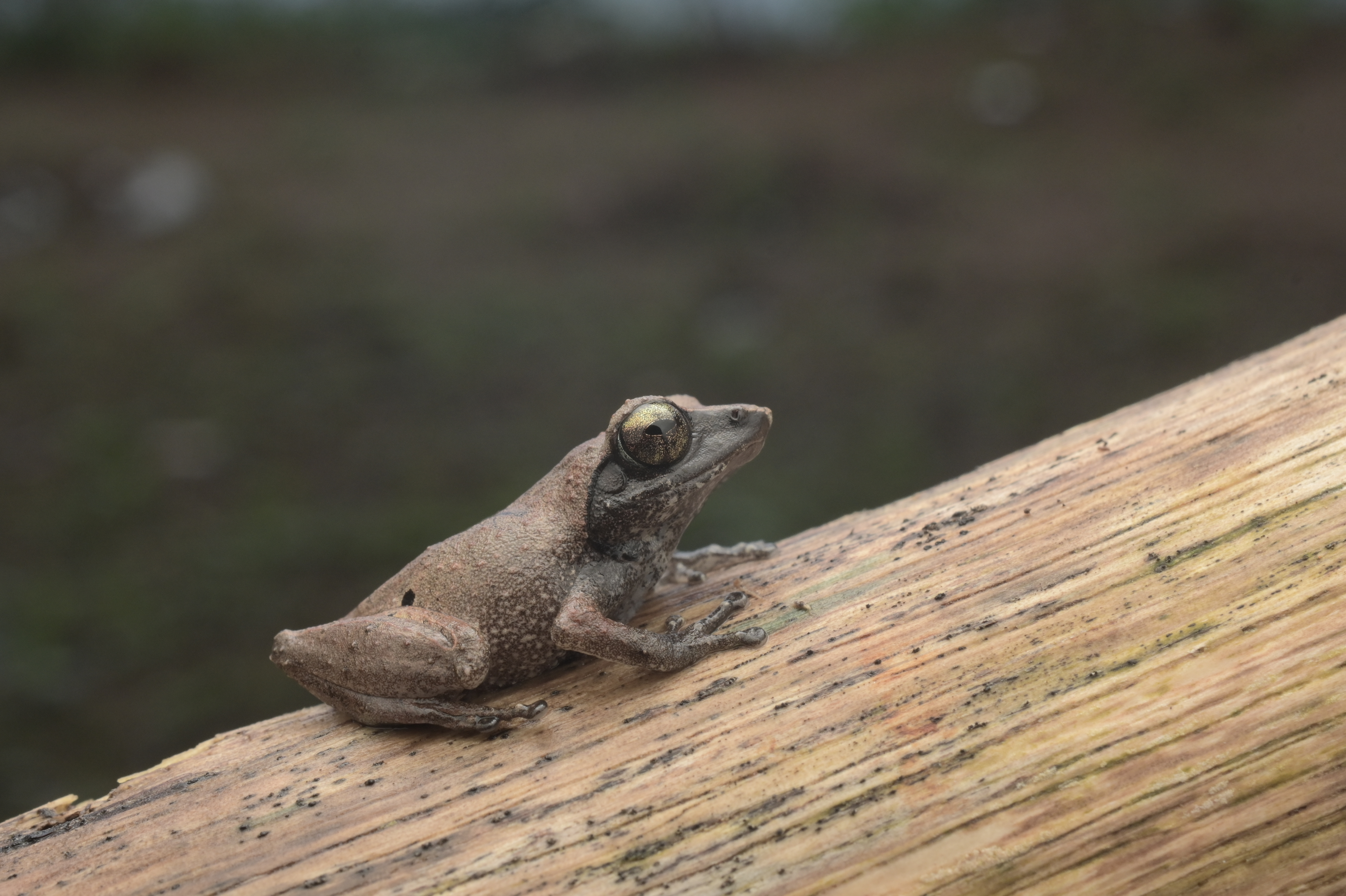
Lateral view

===== Raorchestes beddomii (Beddome's bush frog) =====
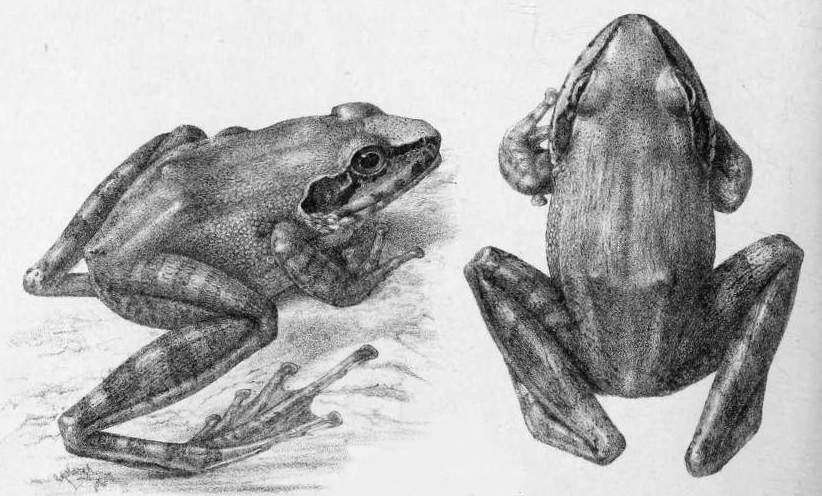
Illustration

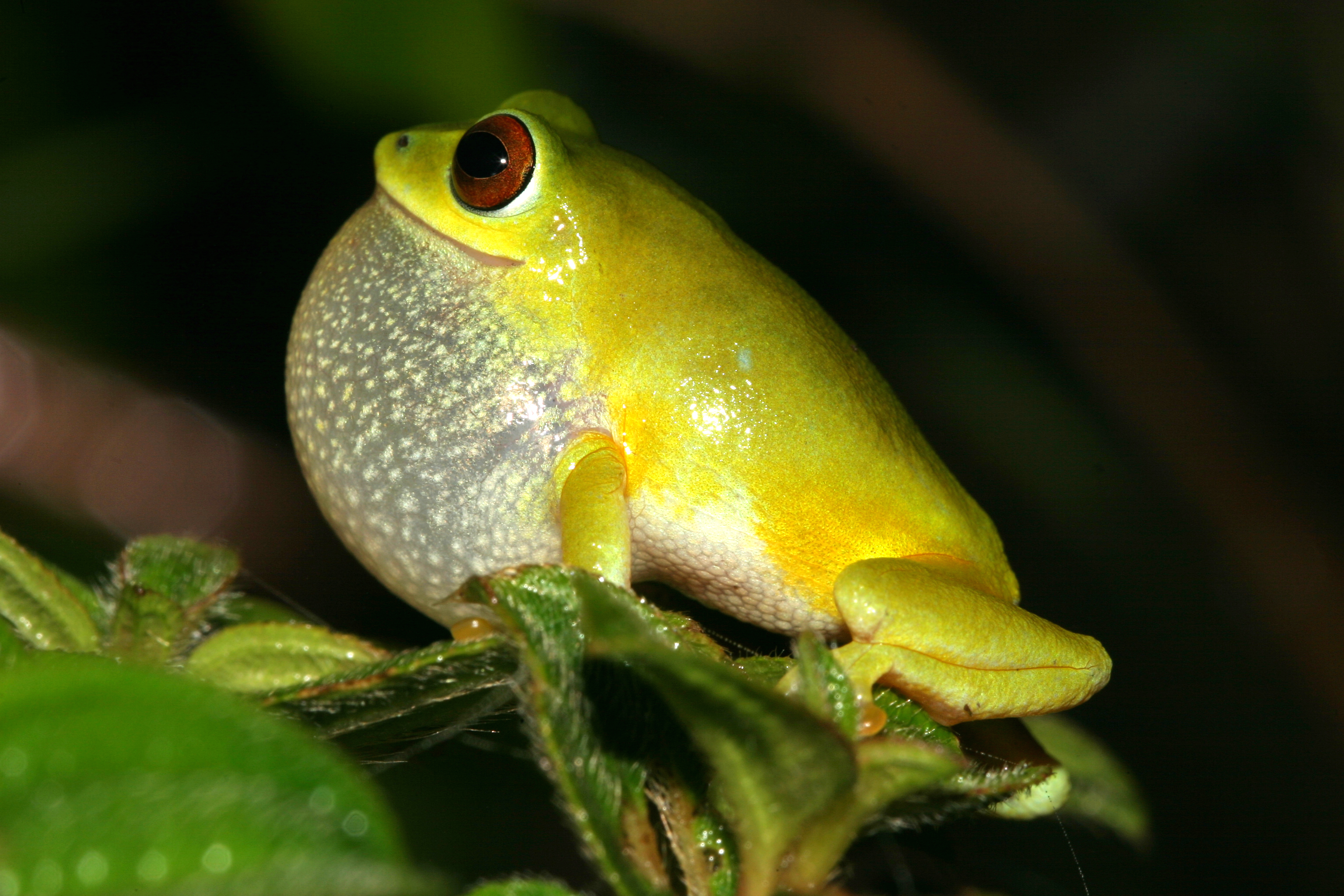
Calling

===== Raorchestes blandus (pleasant bush frog) =====
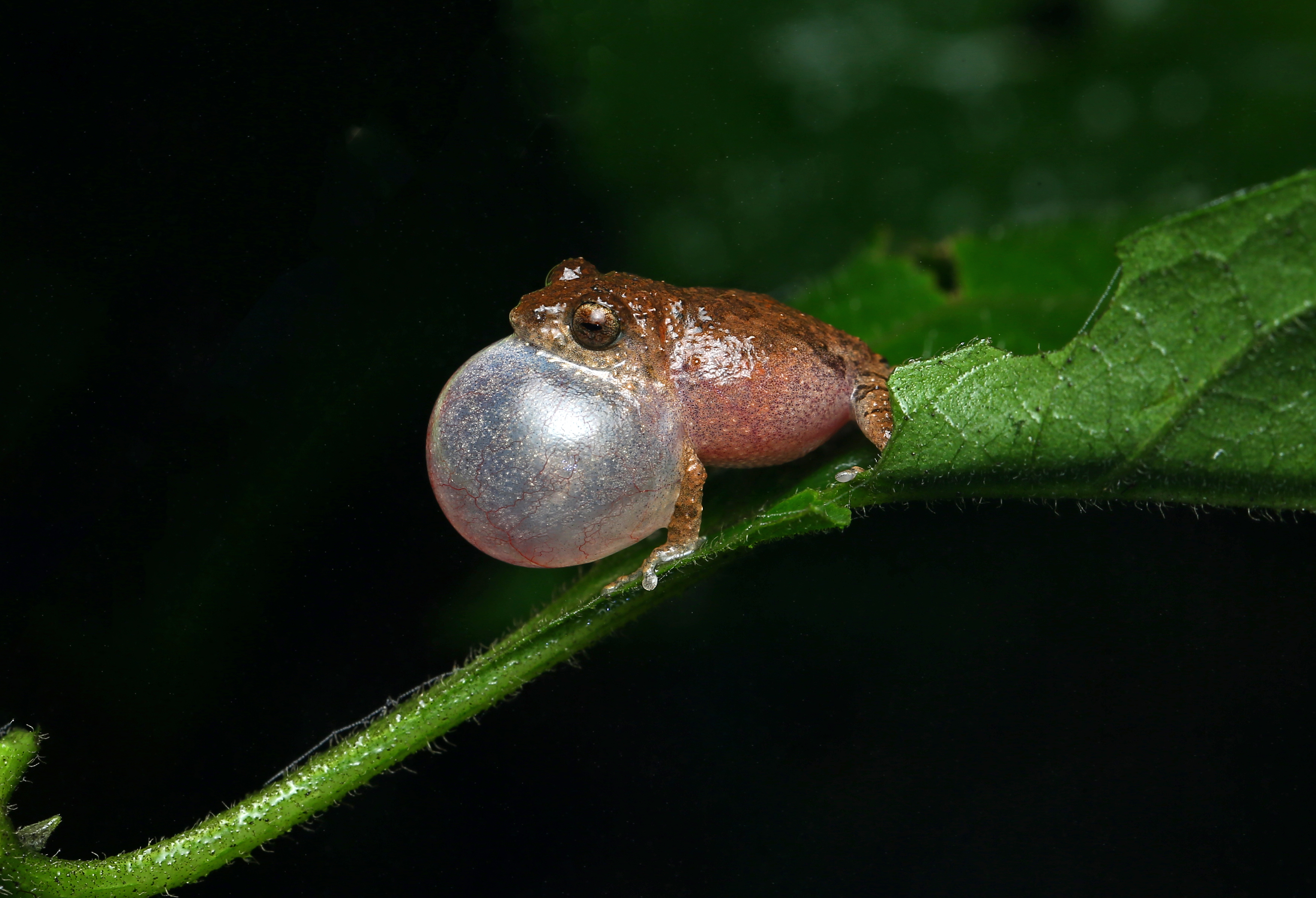
Calling

===== Raorchestes bobingeri (Bob Inger's bush frog) =====
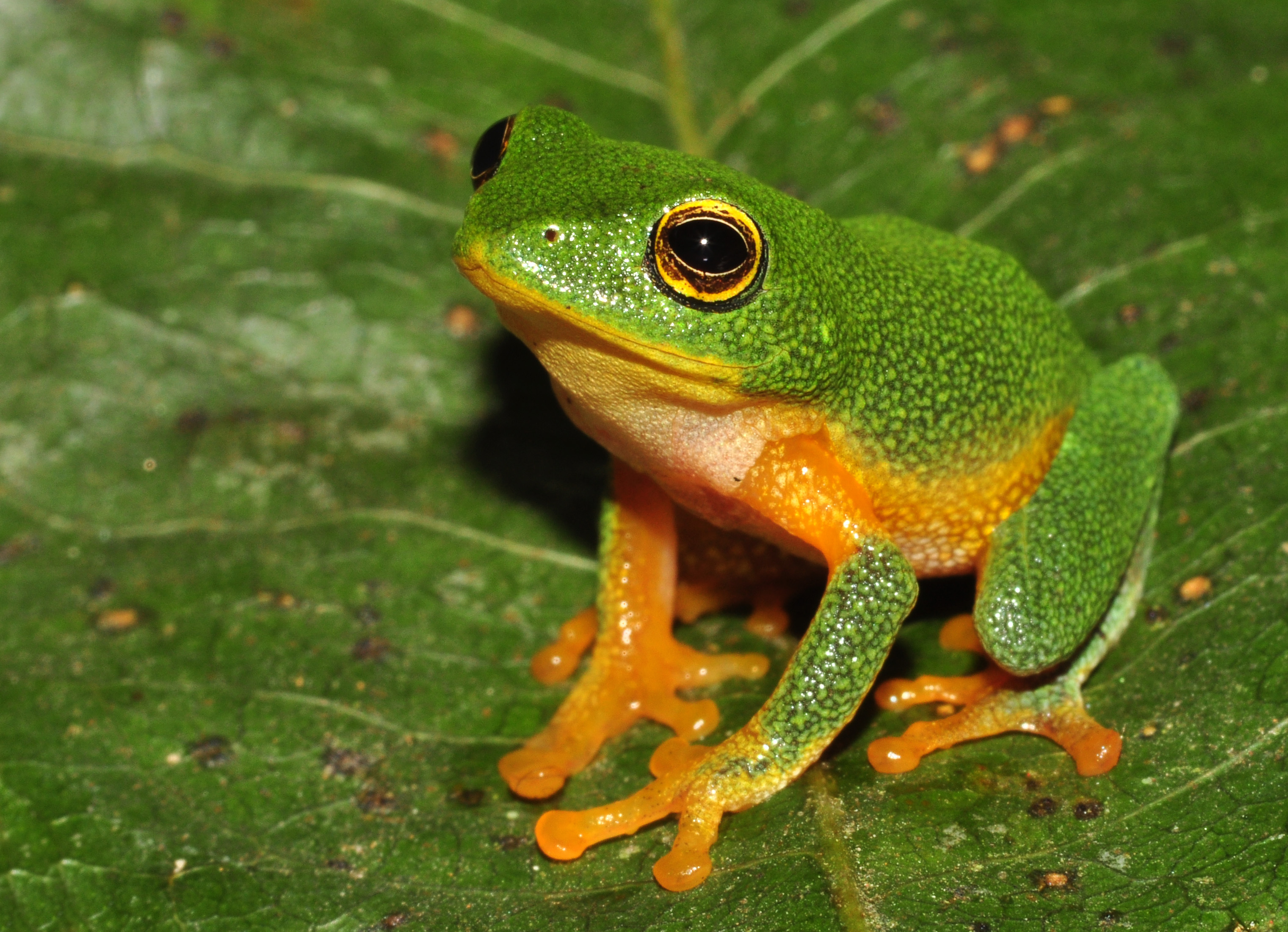
Front view

===== Raorchestes chalazodes (chalazodes bubble-nest frog) =====
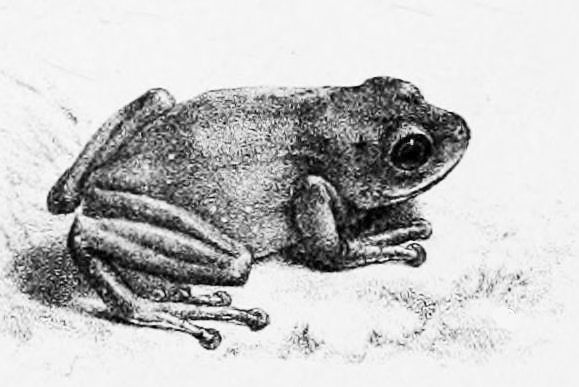
Illustration

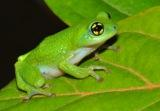
Lateral view

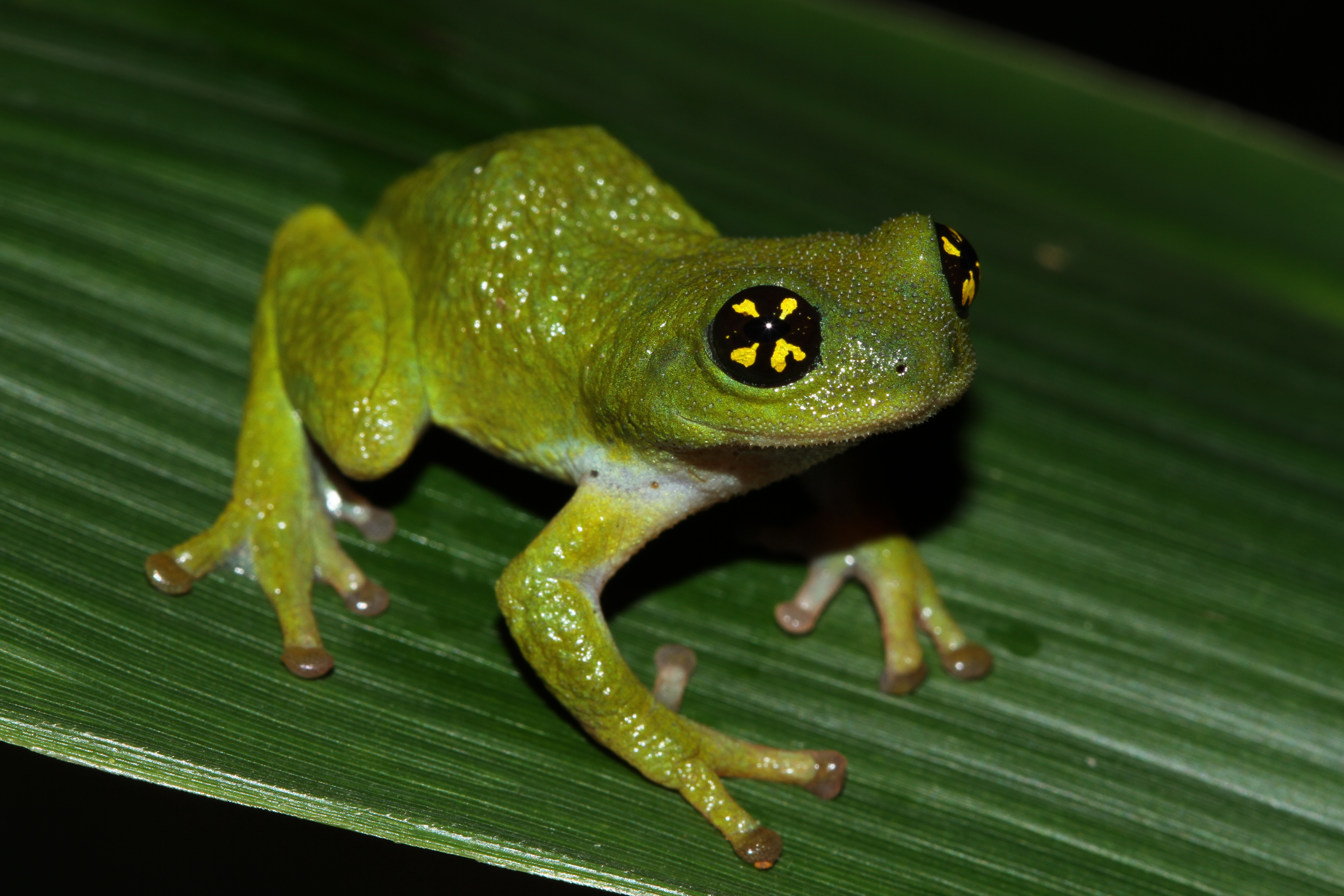
Front view

===== Raorchestes charius (Seshachar's bush frog) =====
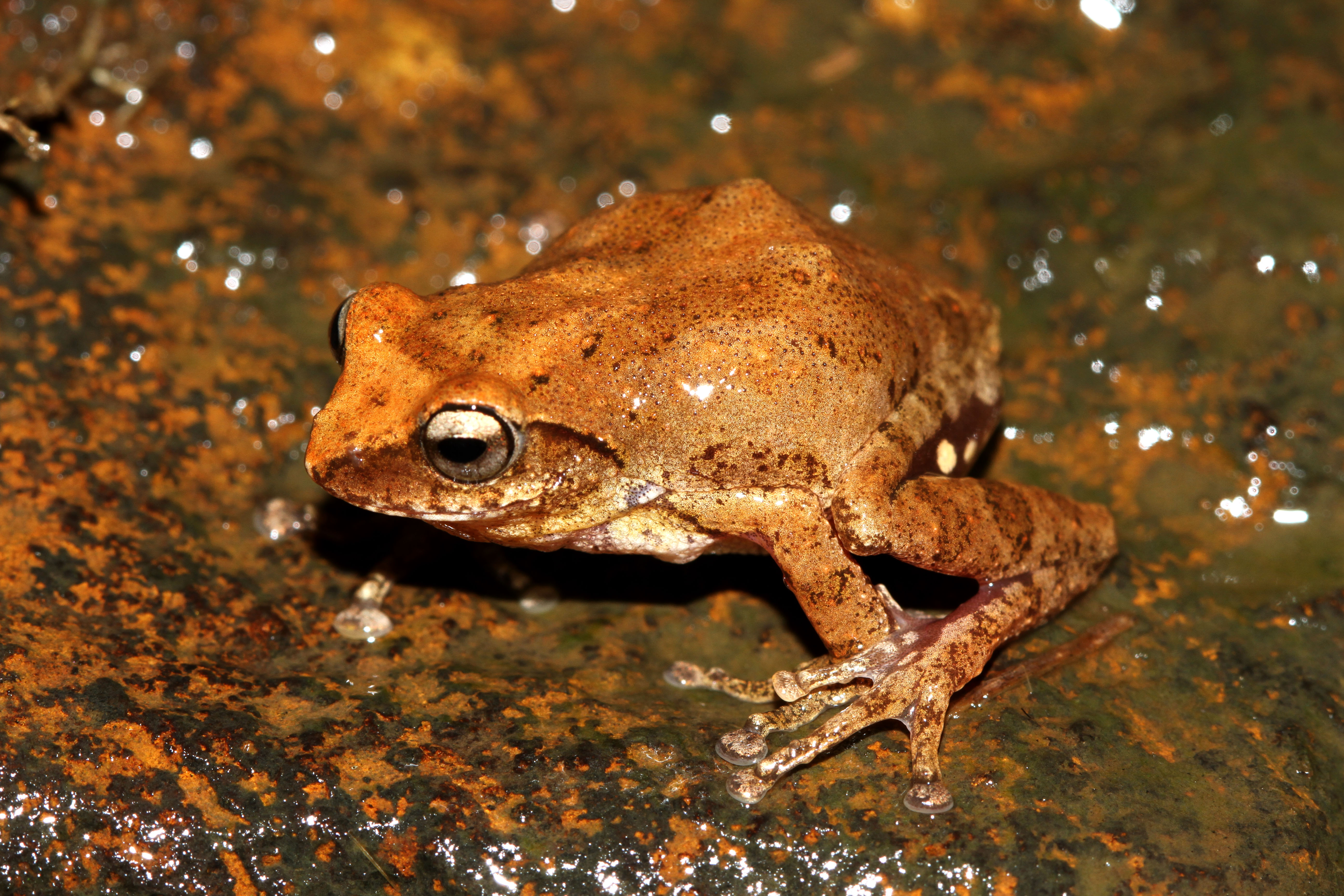
Lateral view

===== Raorchestes chlorosomma (green-eyed bush frog) =====
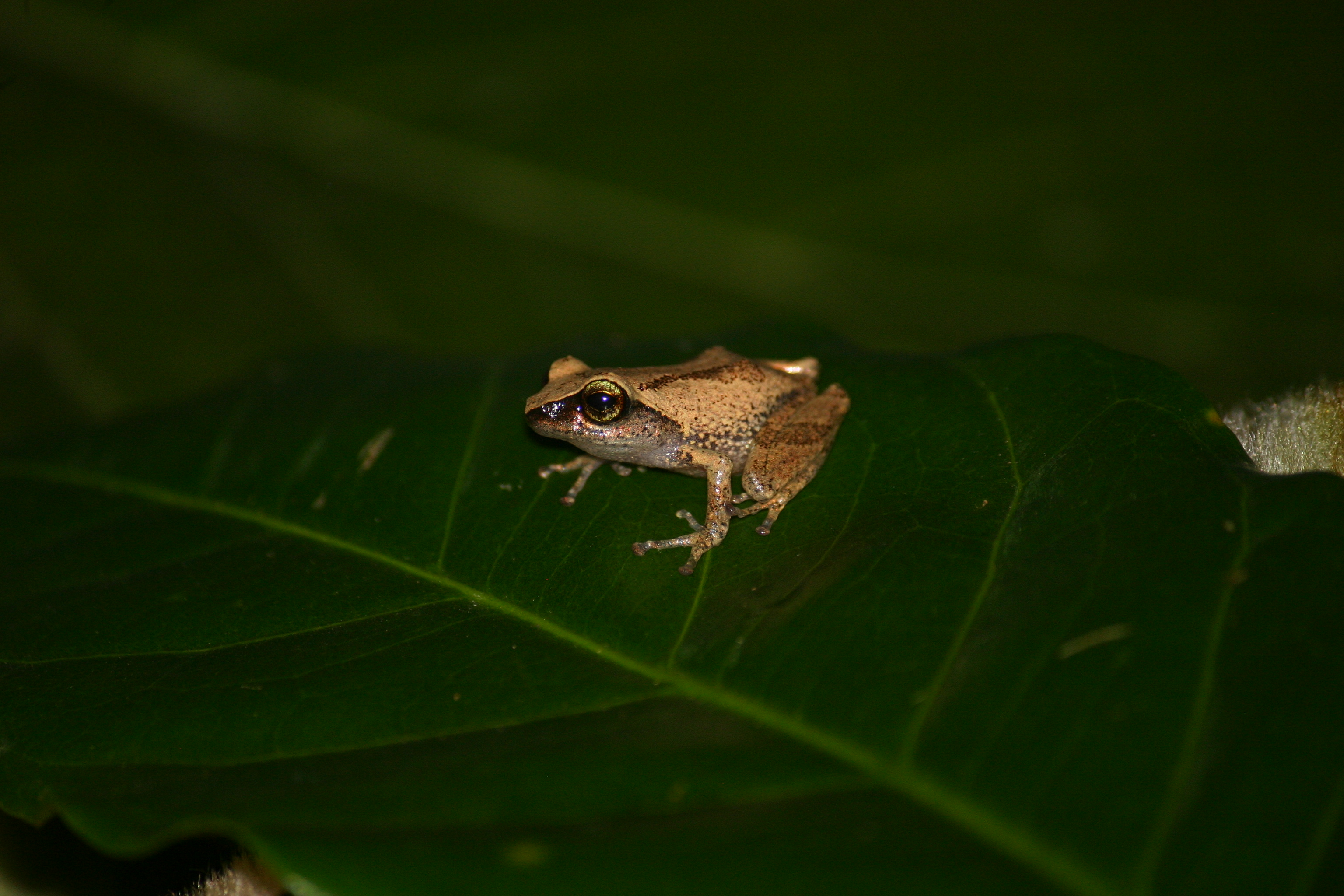
Lateral view

===== Raorchestes chotta (small bush frog) =====
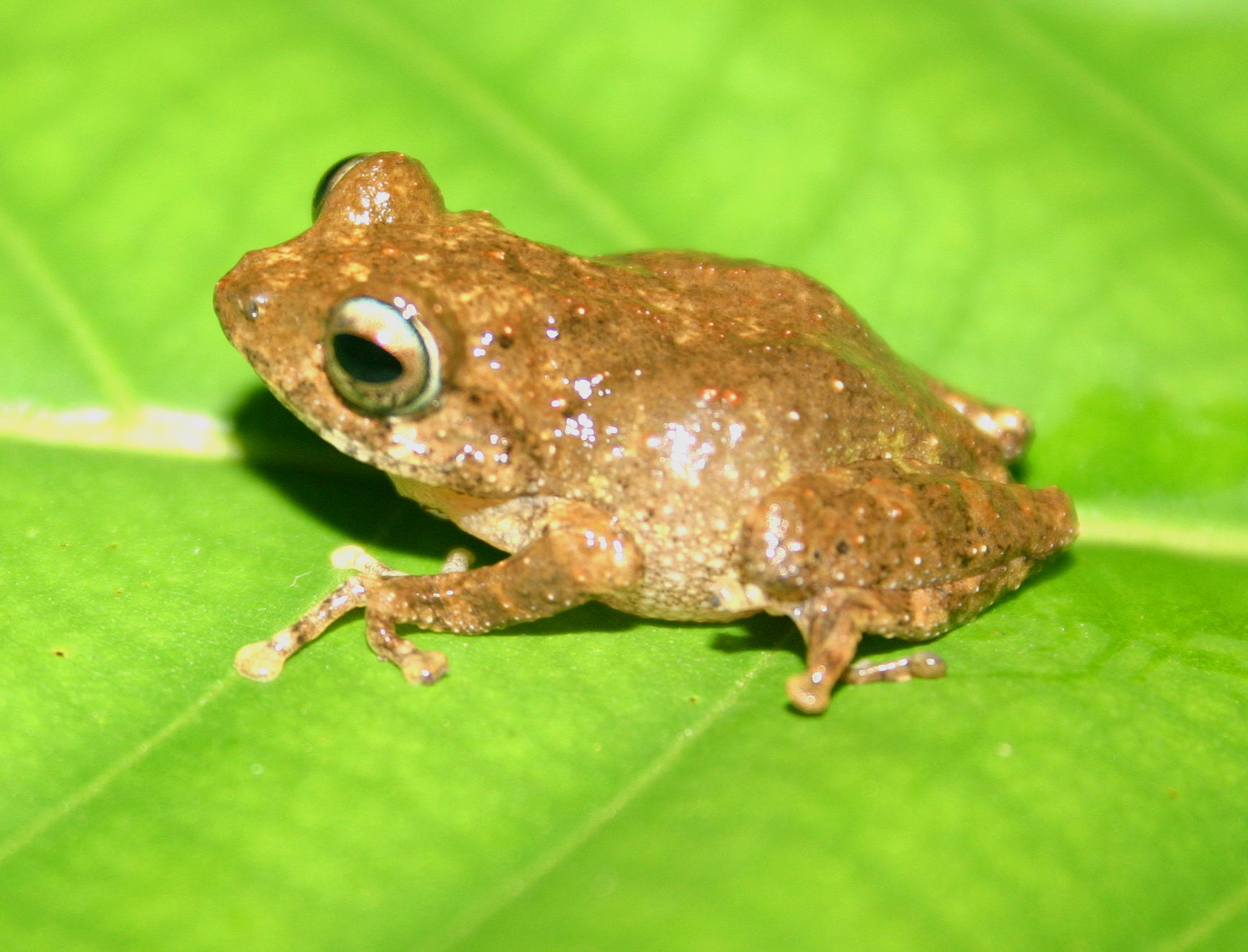
Lateral view

===== Raorchestes chromasynchysi (confusing green bush frog) =====
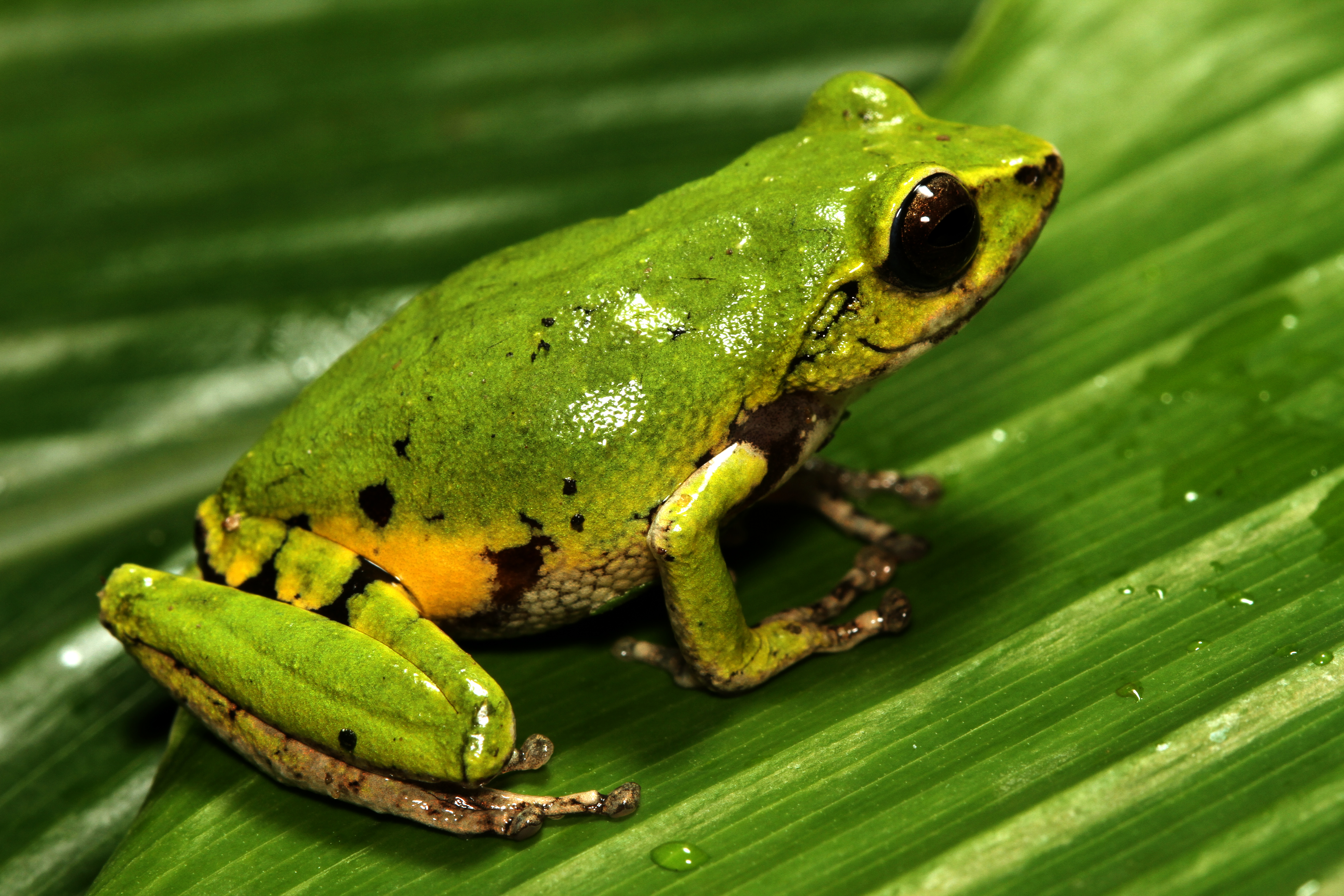
Lateral view

===== Raorchestes crustai (bark bush frog) =====
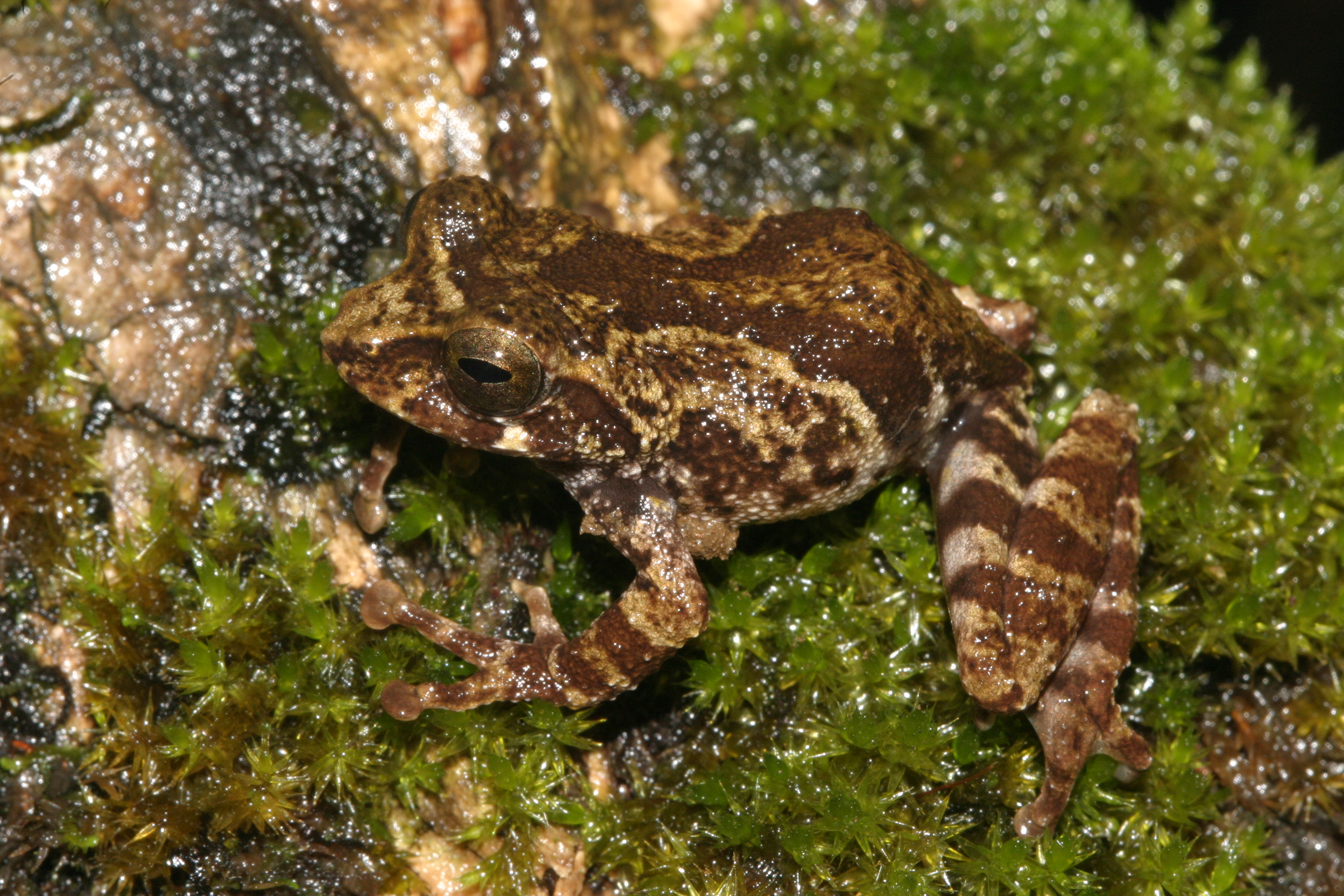
Lateral view

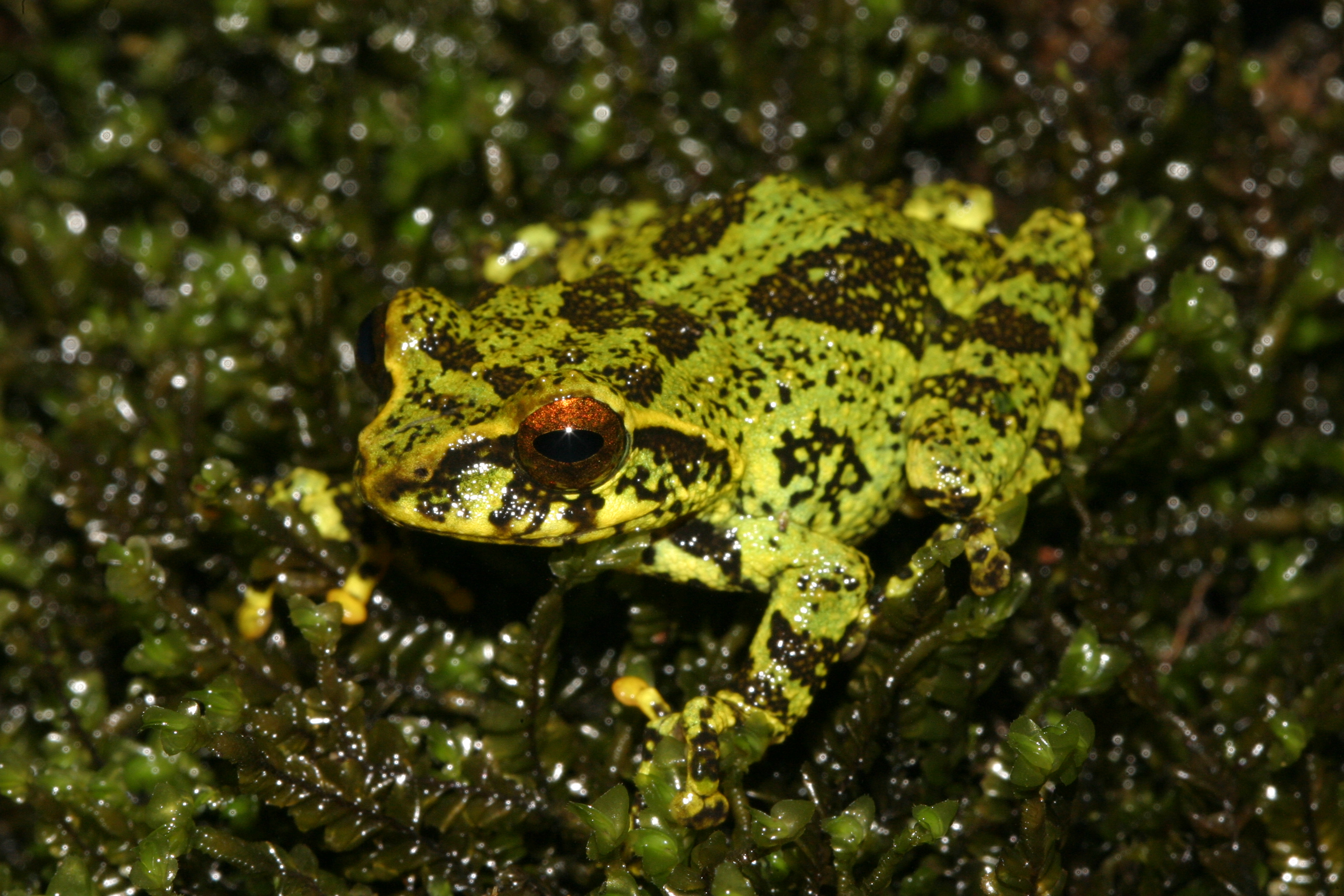
Female

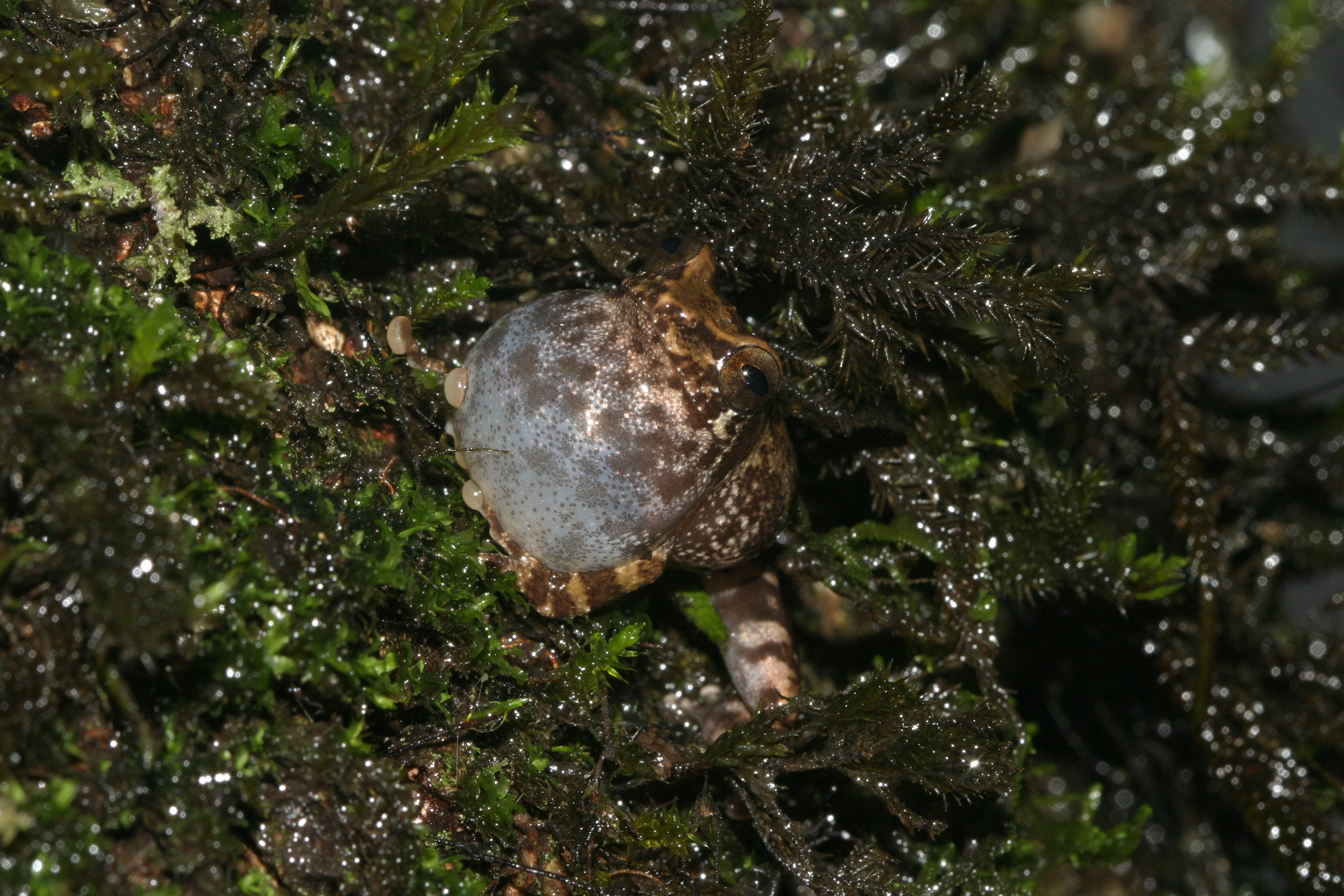
Calling

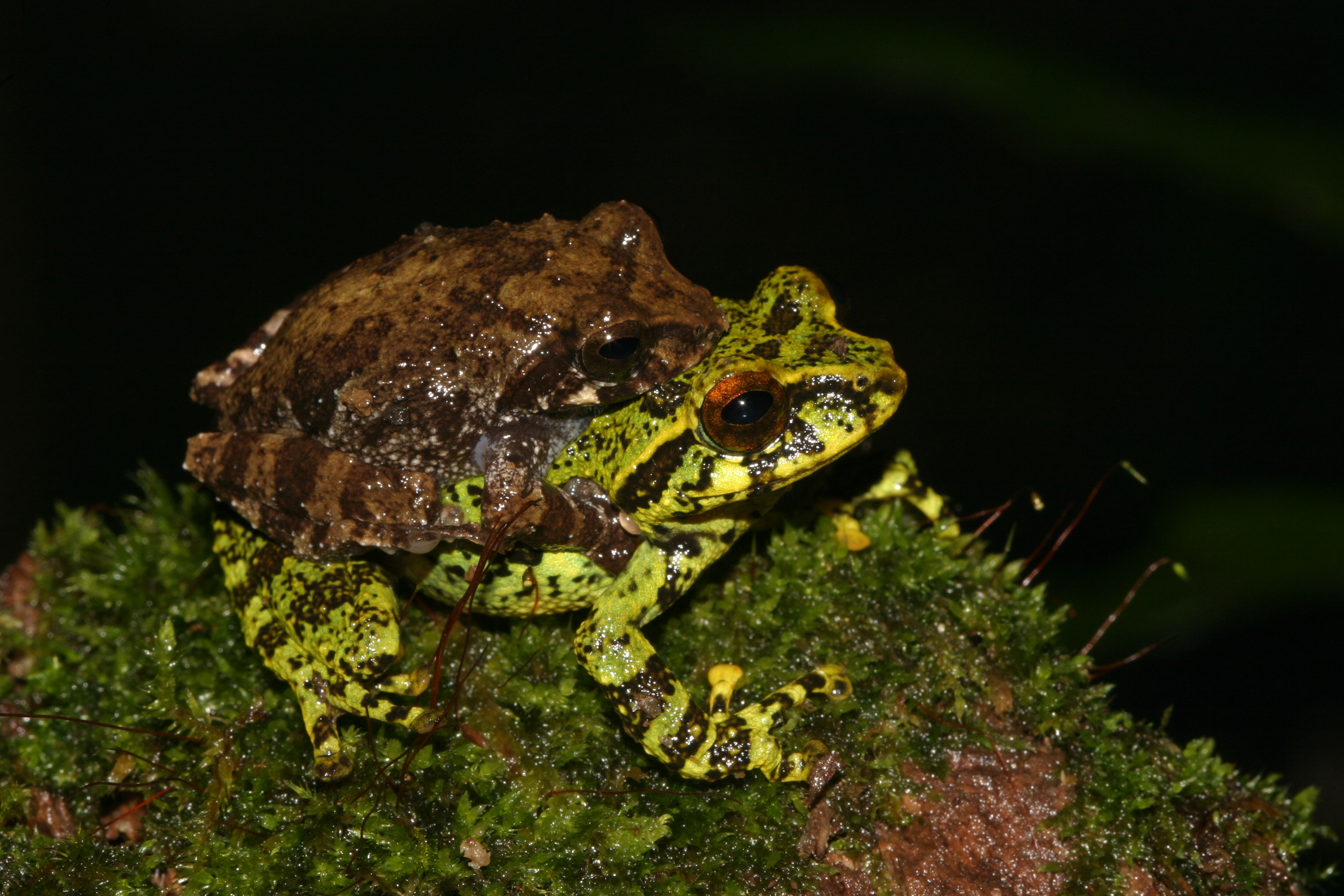
Mating

===== Raorchestes dubois (Kodaikanal bush frog) =====
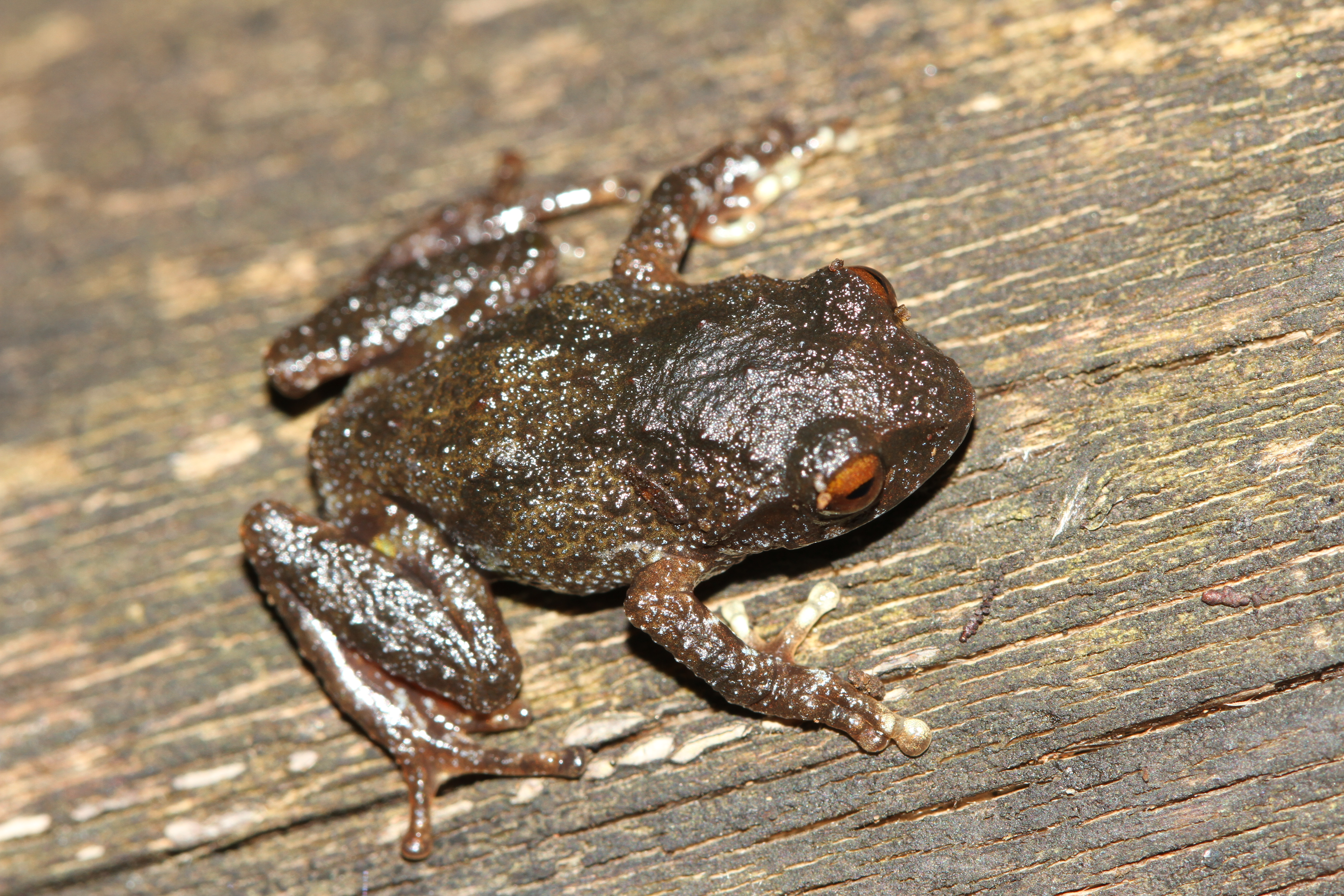
Dorsal view

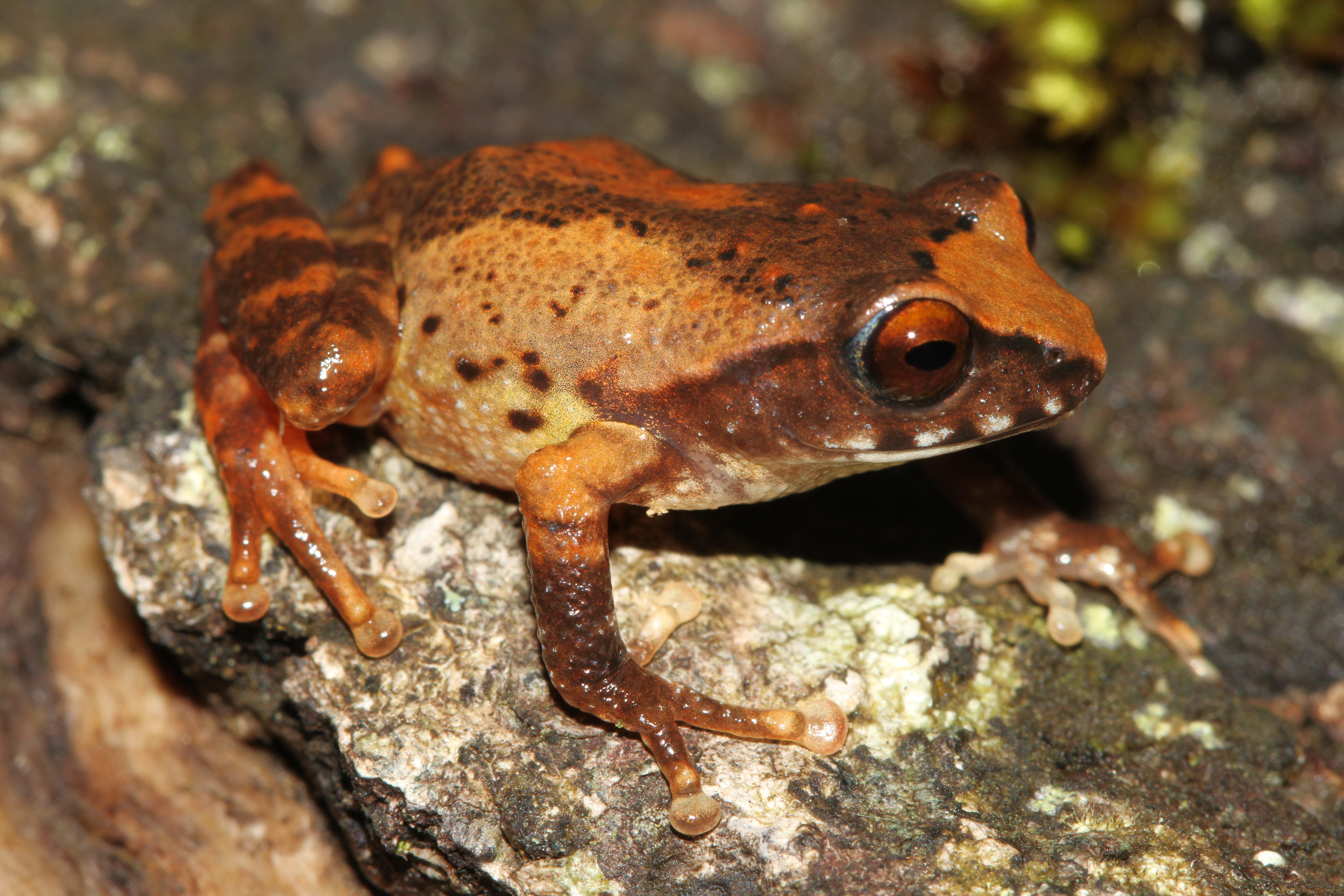
Lateral view

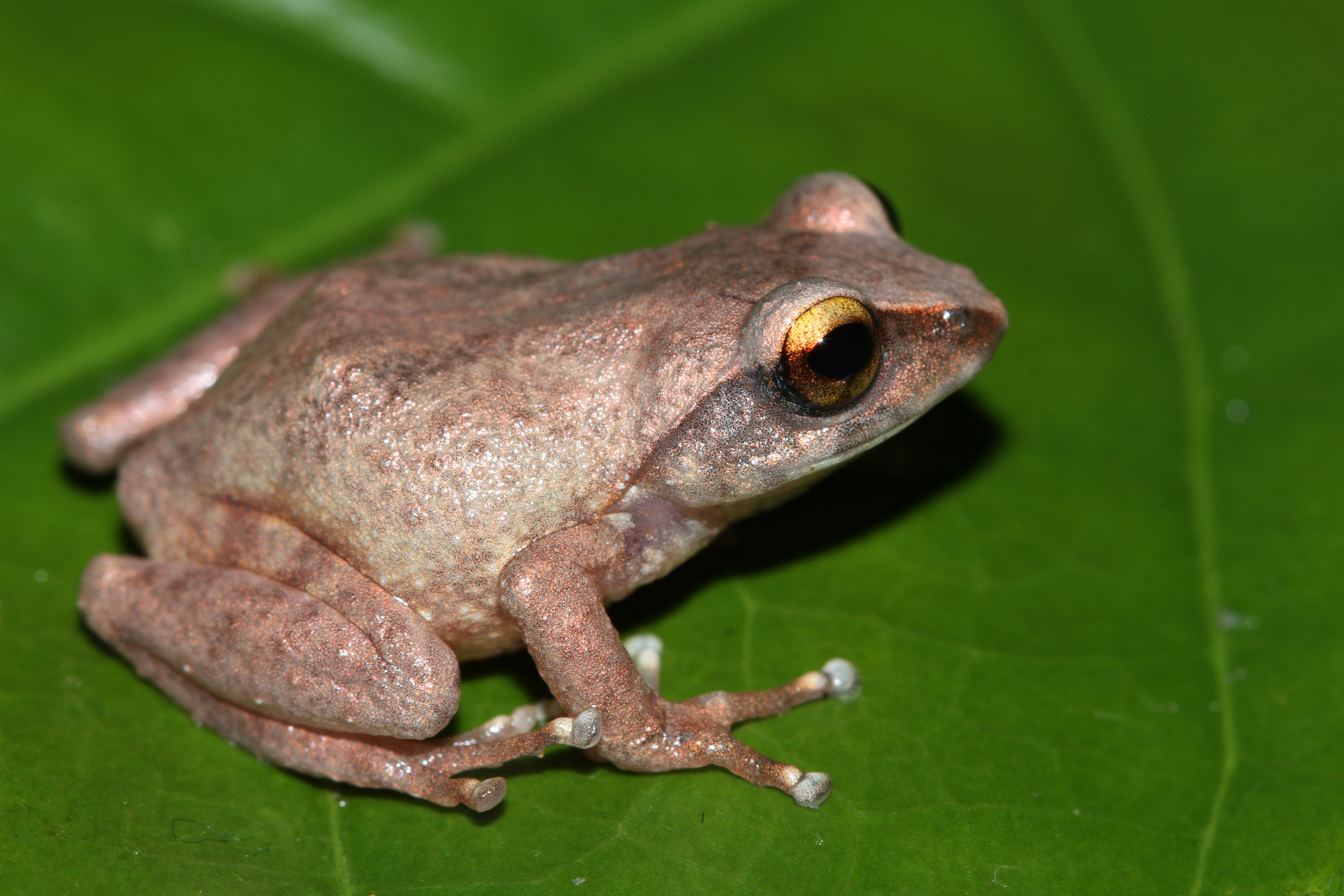
Lateral view

===== Raorchestes flaviventris (yellow-bellied bush frog) =====
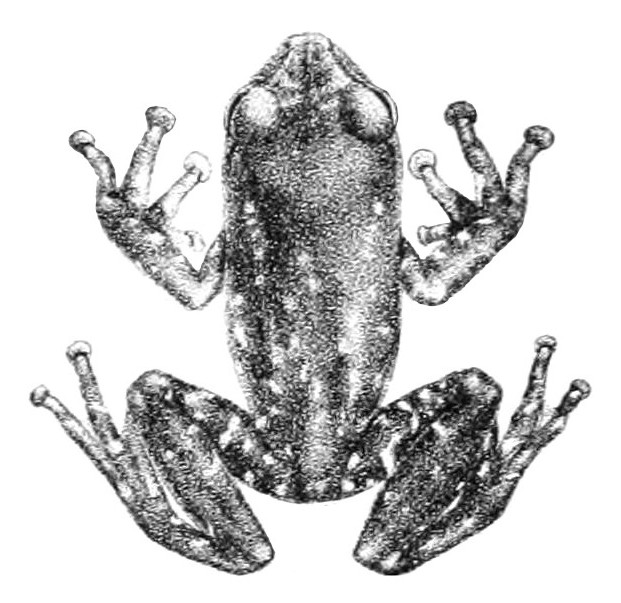
Illustration

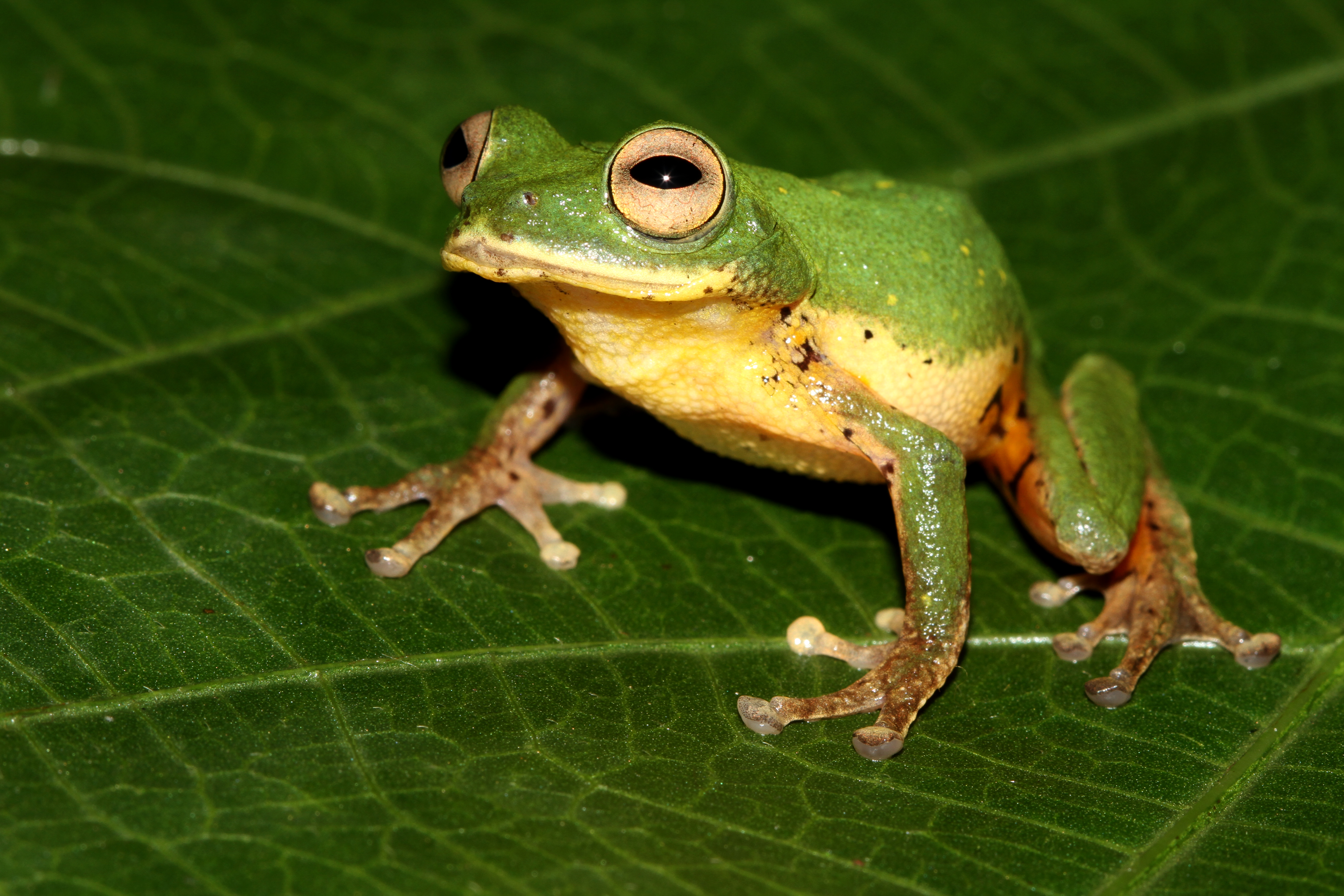
Lateral view

===== Raorchestes glandulosus (glandular bush frog) =====
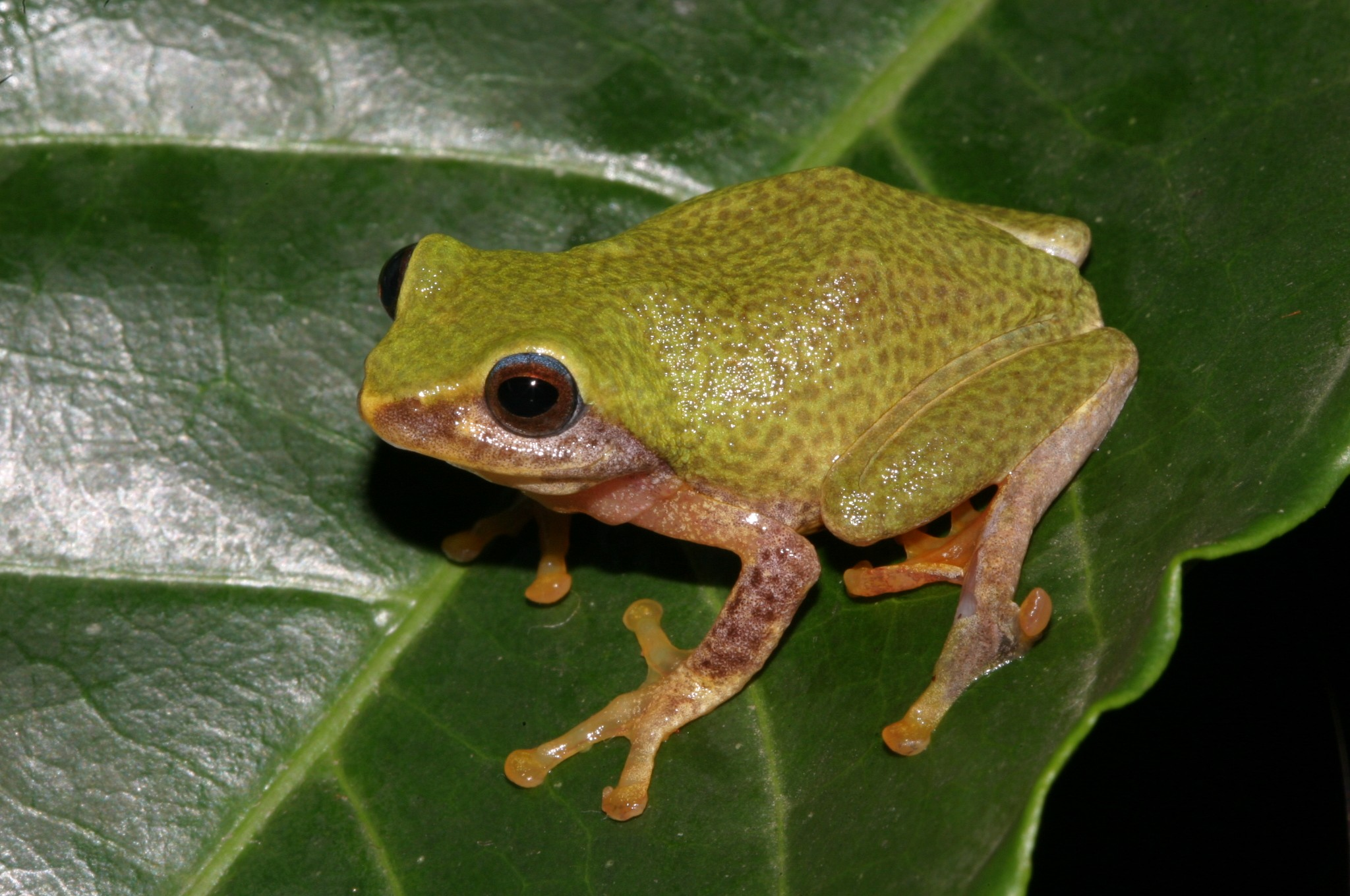
Lateral view

===== Raorchestes graminirupes (Ponmudi bush frog) =====
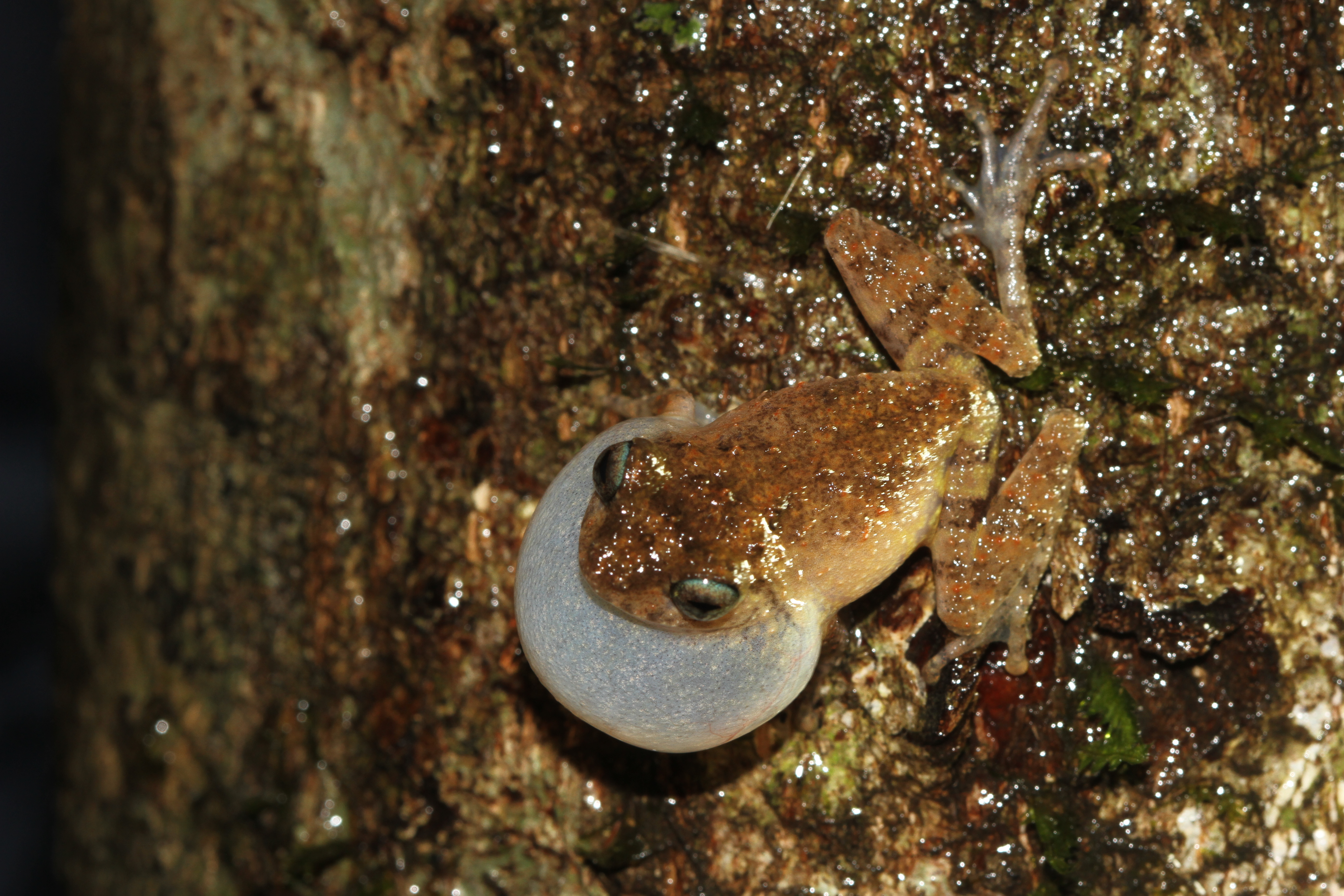
Calling

===== Raorchestes griet (Griet bush frog) =====
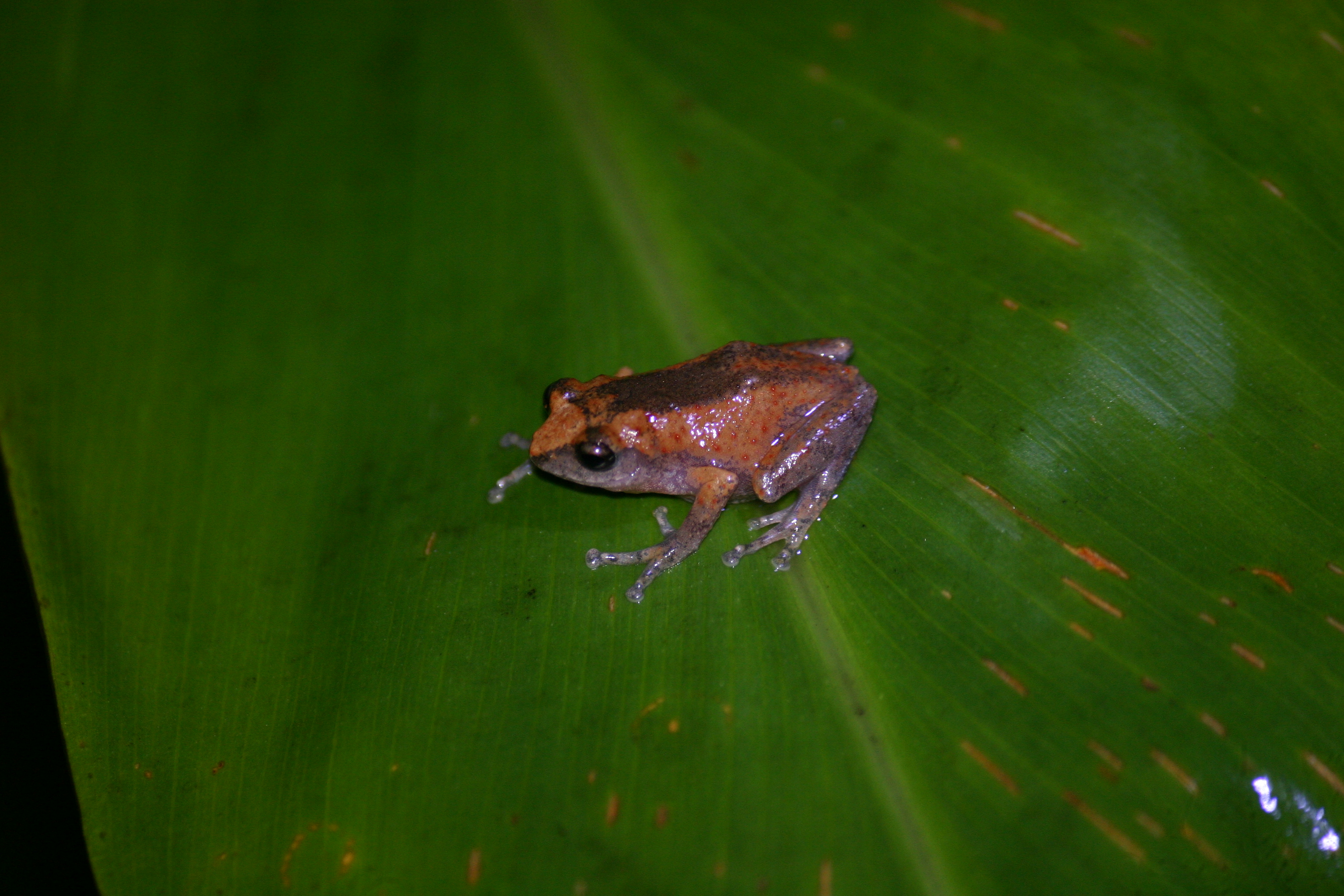
Lateral view

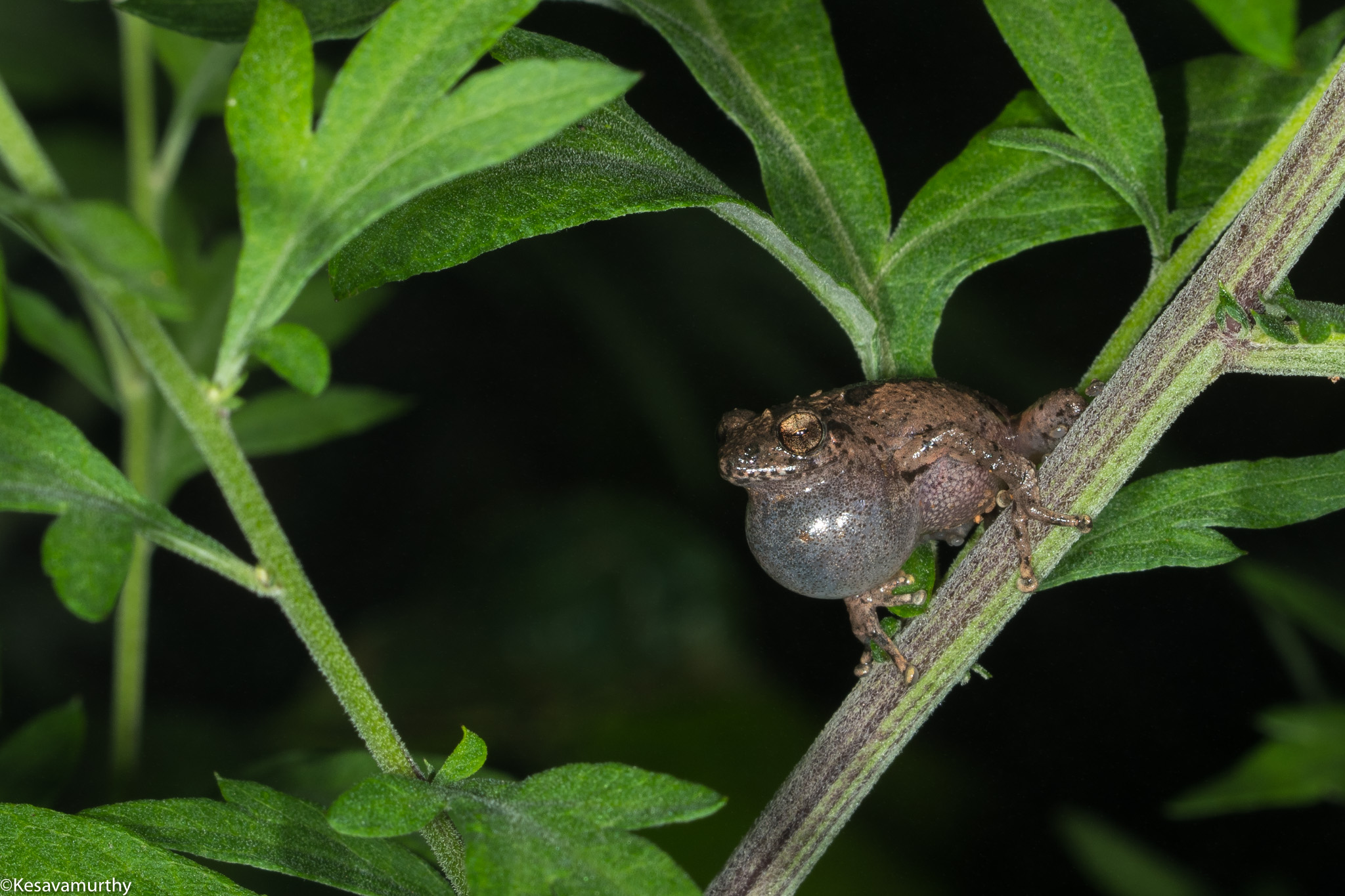
Calling

===== Raorchestes jayarami (Jayaram's bush frog) =====
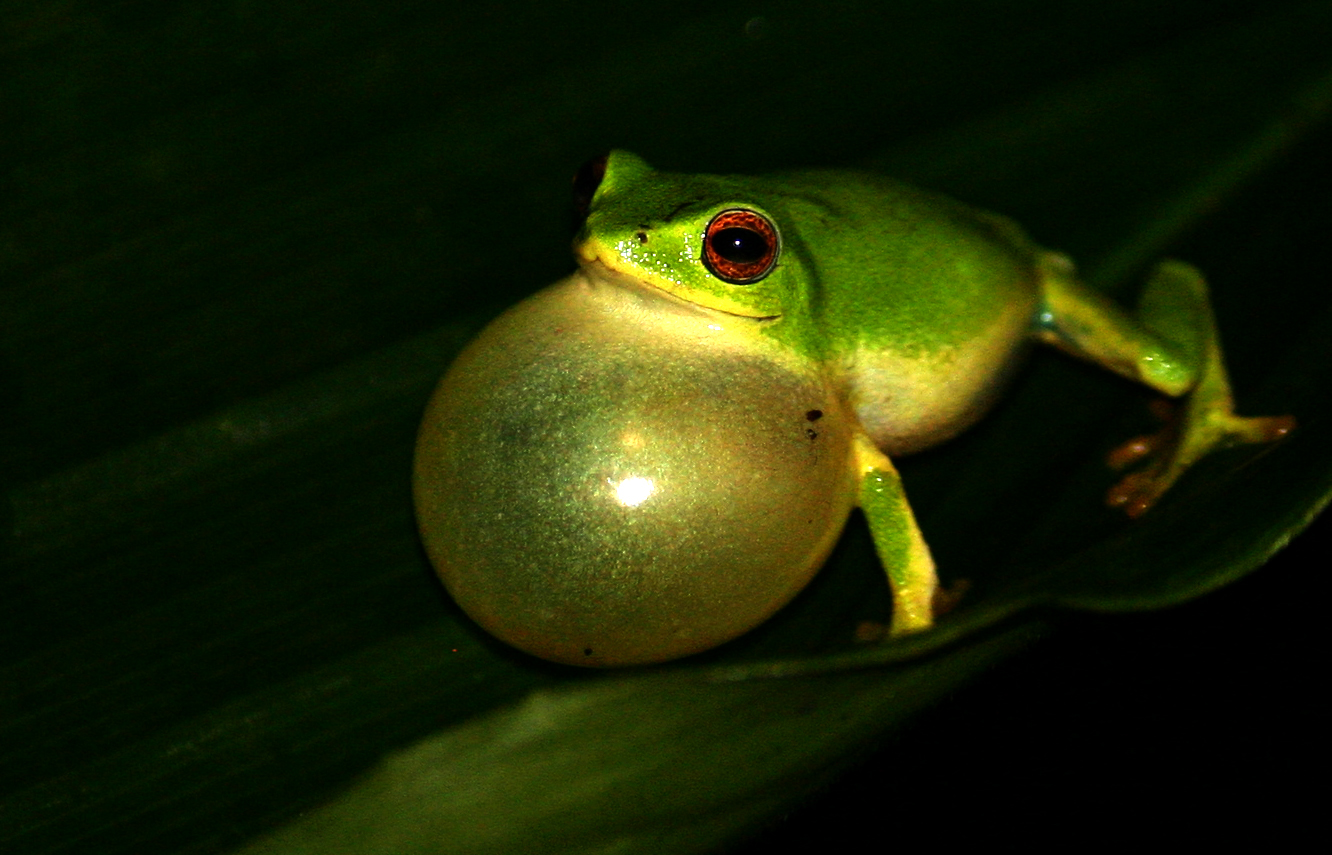
Calling

===== Raorchestes johnceei (Johnceei's bush frog) =====
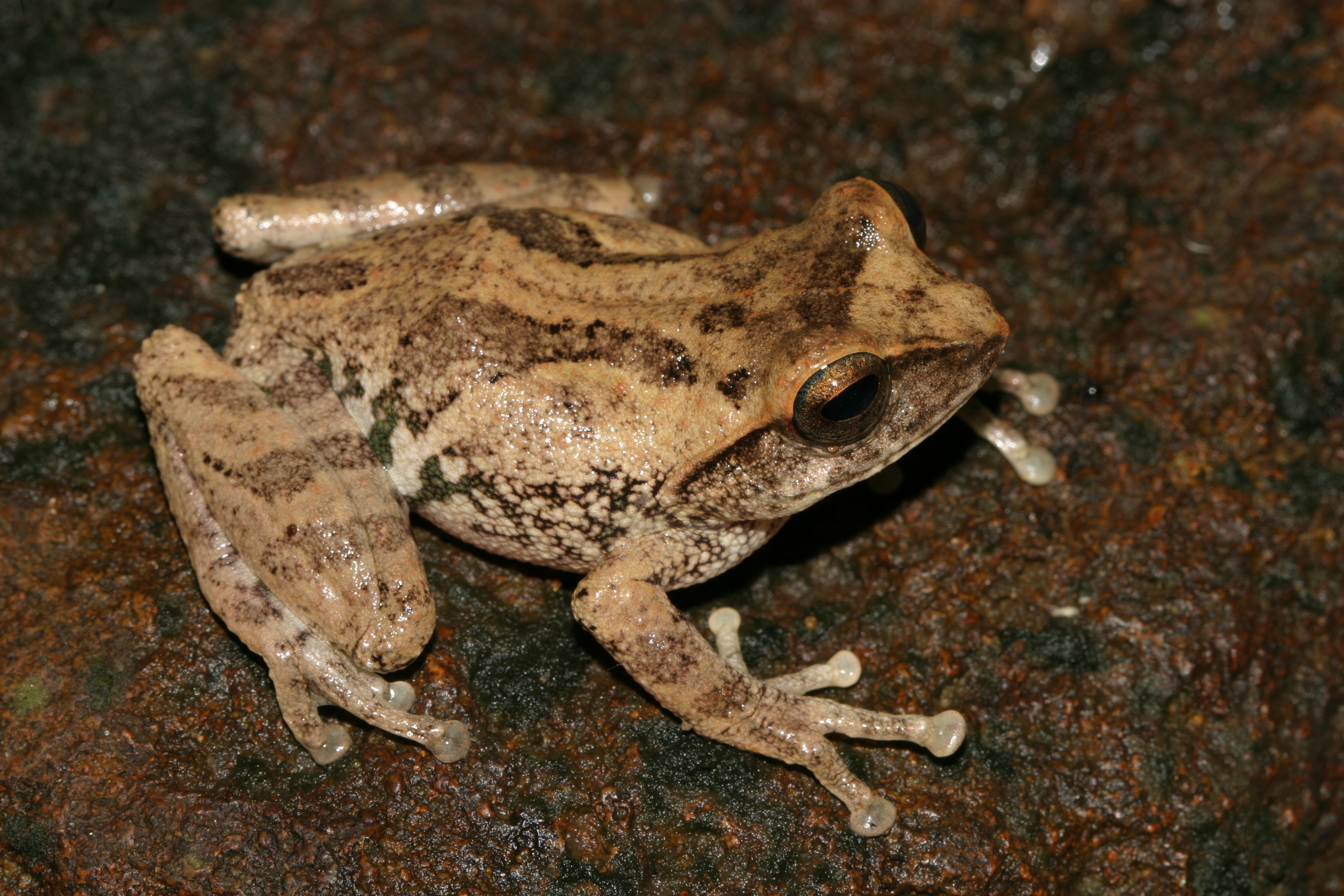
Dorsal view

===== Raorchestes kadalarensis (Kadalar bush frog) =====
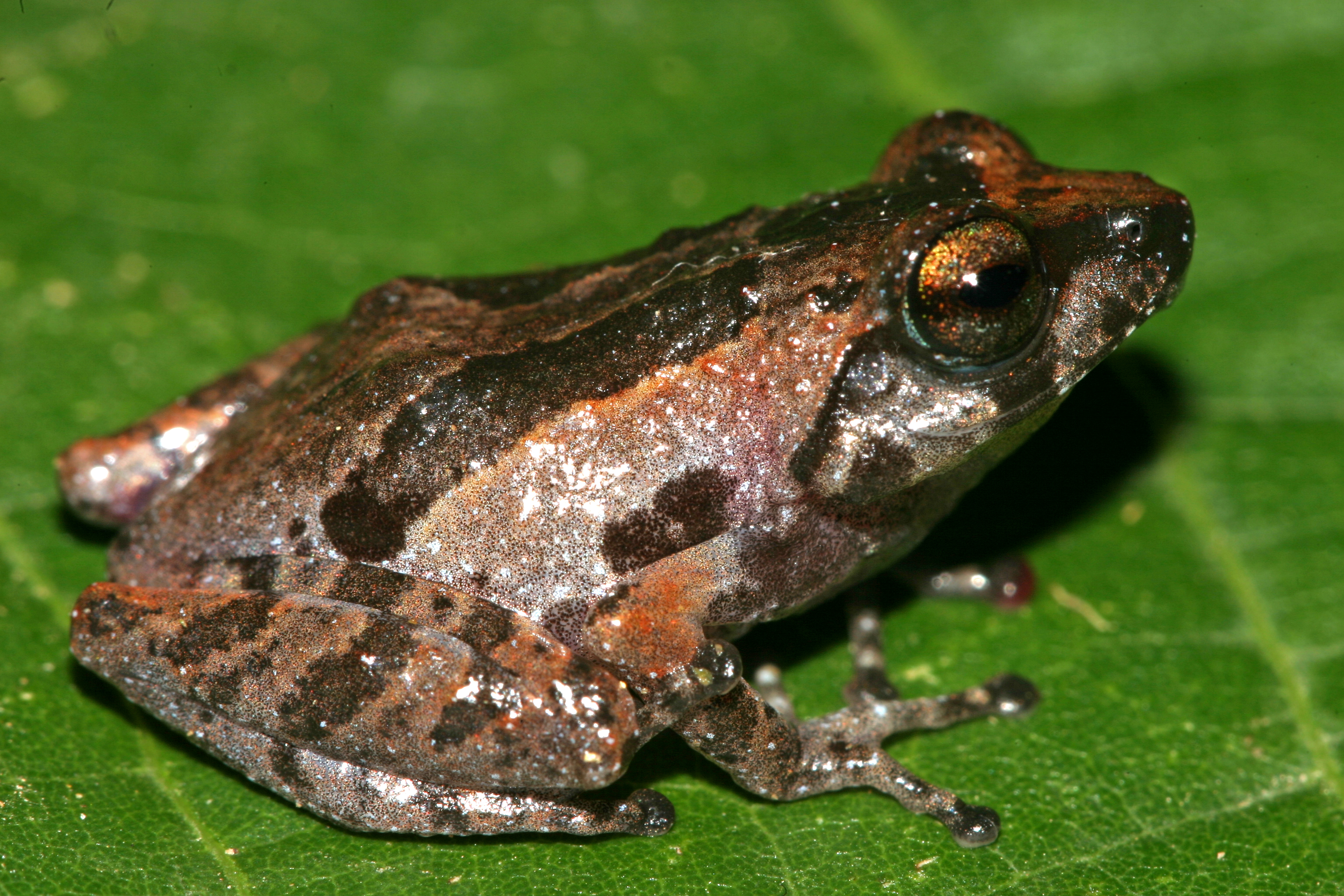
Lateral view

===== Raorchestes kaikatti (Kaikatt's bush frog) =====
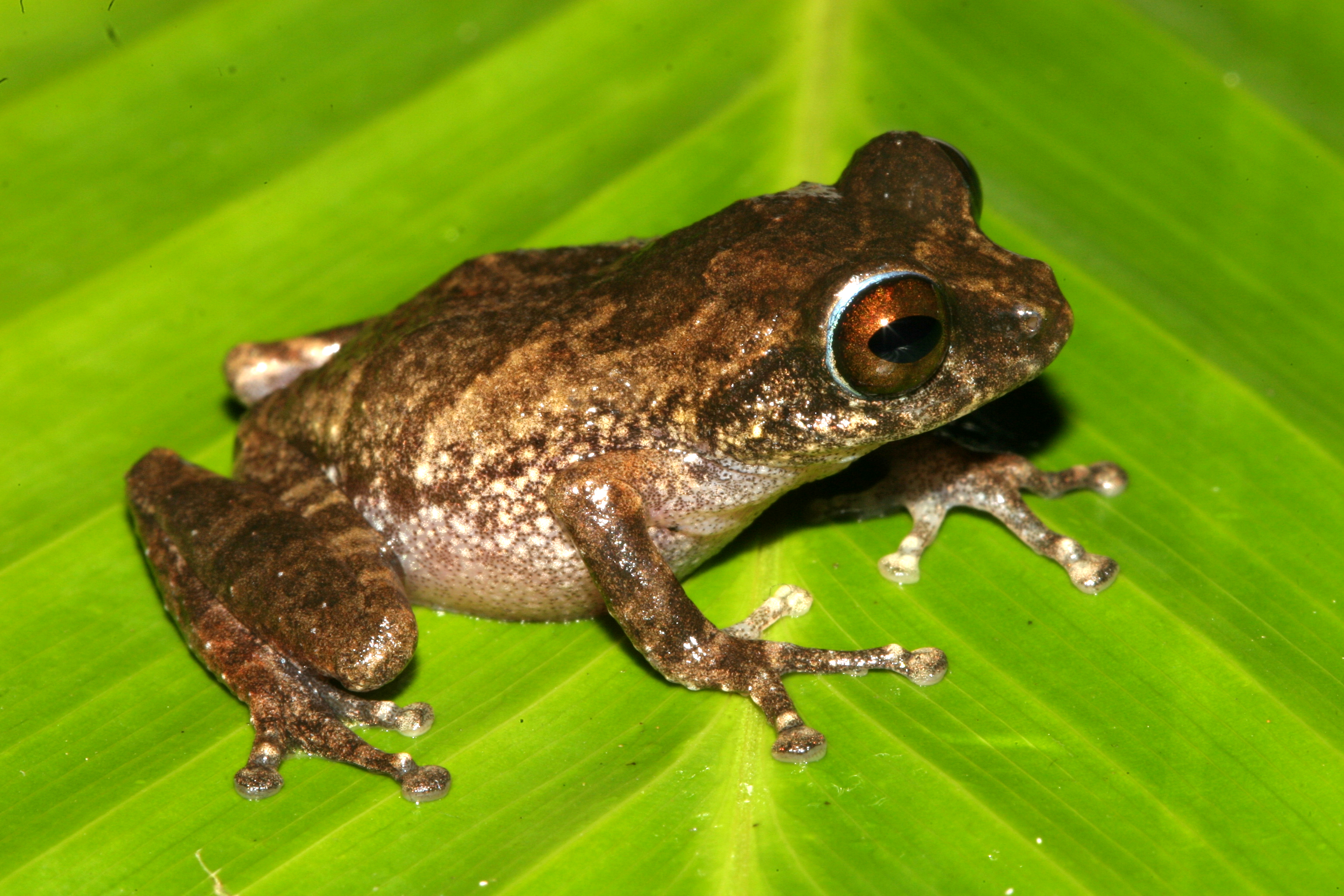
Lateral view

===== Raorchestes kakachi (Kakachi bush frog) =====
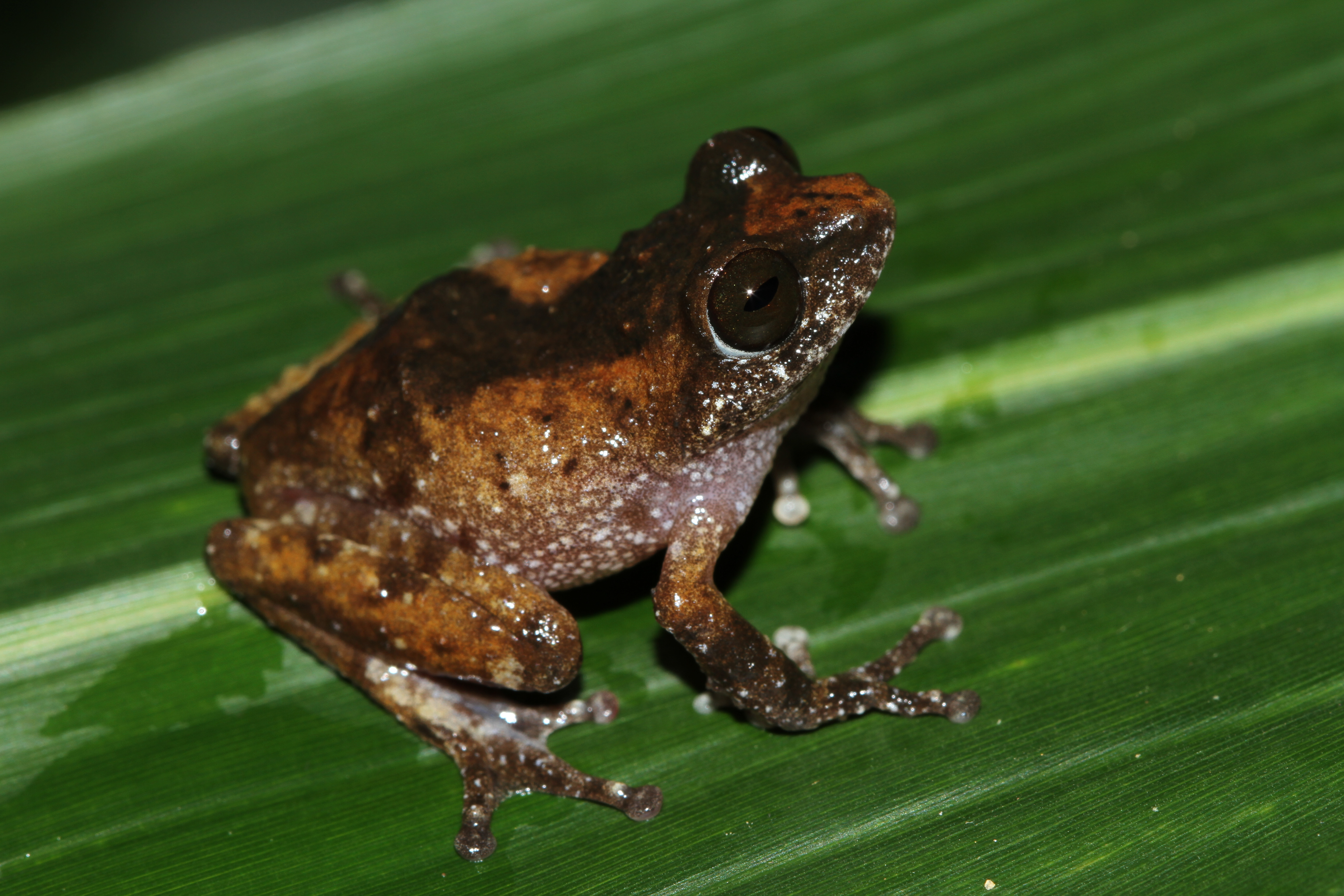
lateral view

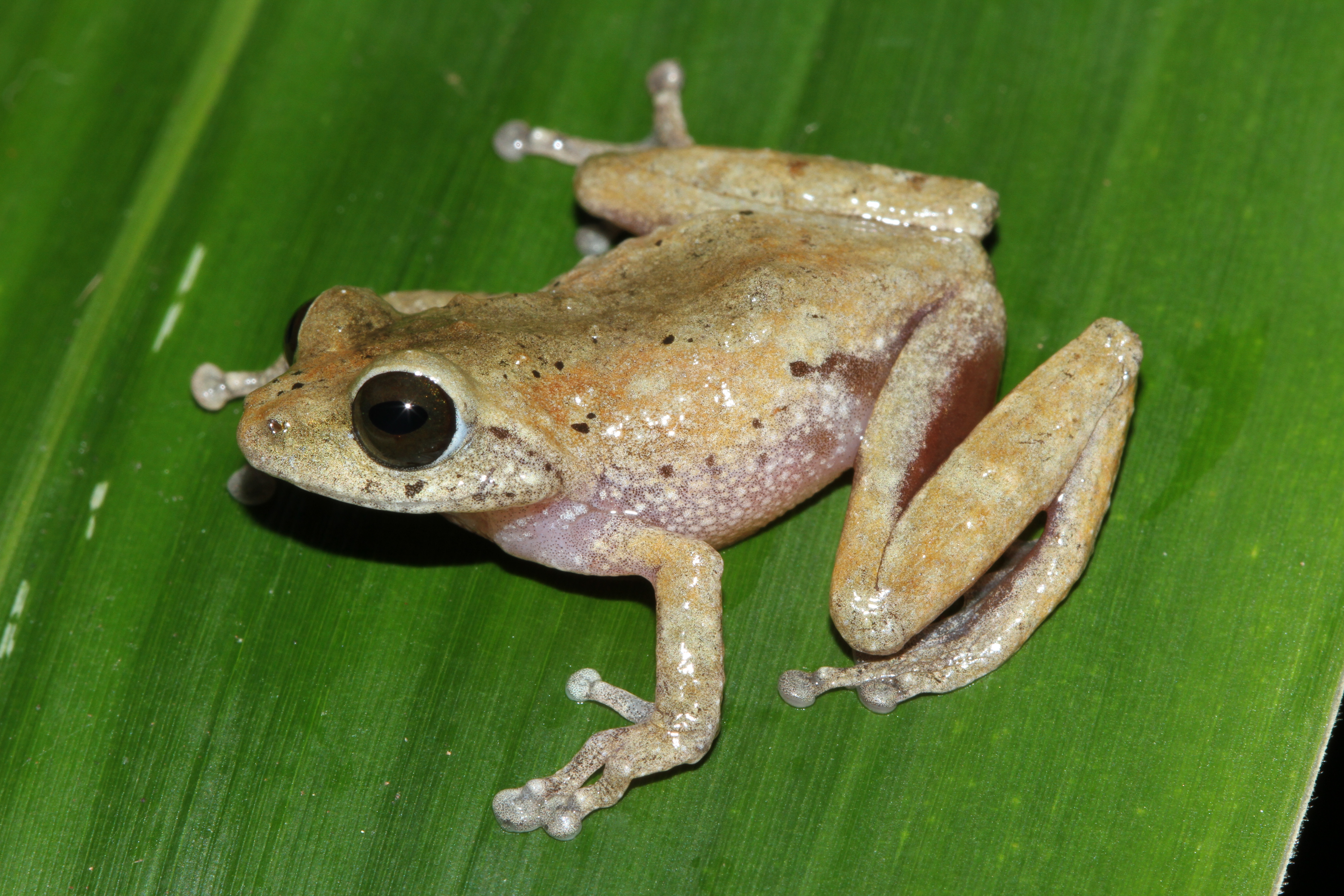
lateral view

===== Raorchestes manohari (beautiful reed bush frog) =====
Lateral view

===== Raorchestes marki (Mark's bush frog) =====
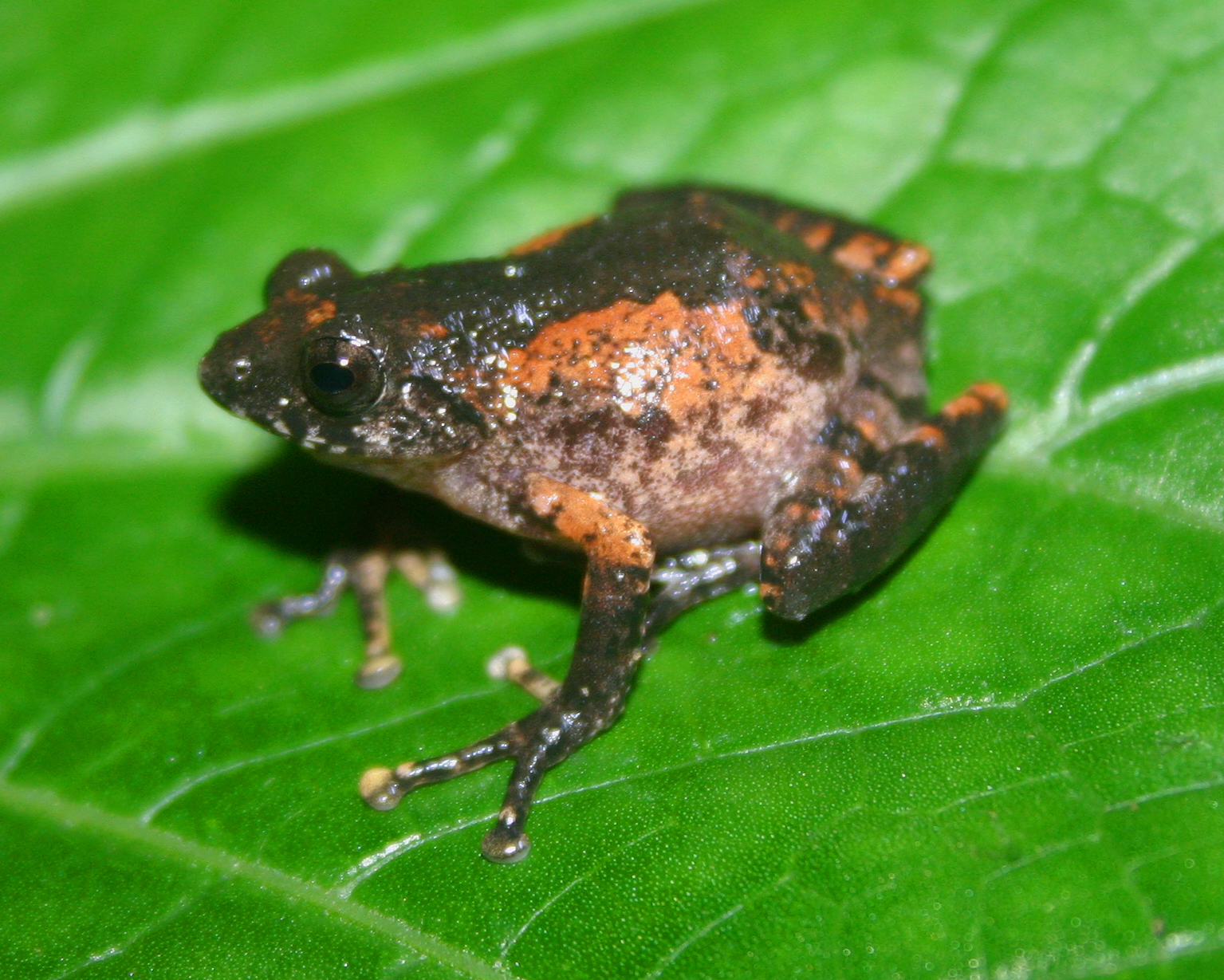
Lateral view

===== Raorchestes munnarensis (Munnar bush frog) =====
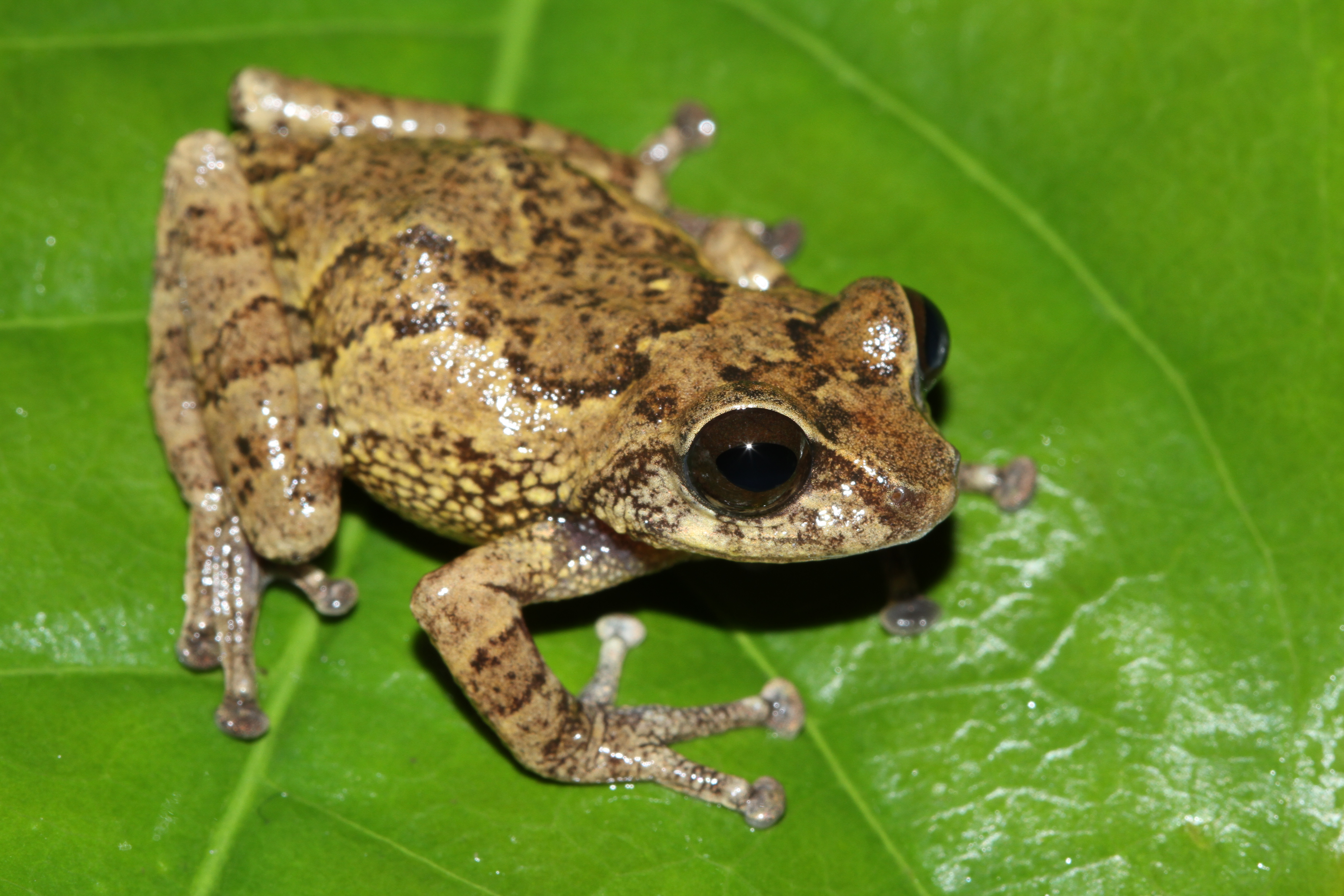
Lateral view

===== Raorchestes nerostagona (Kalpetta yellow bush frog) =====
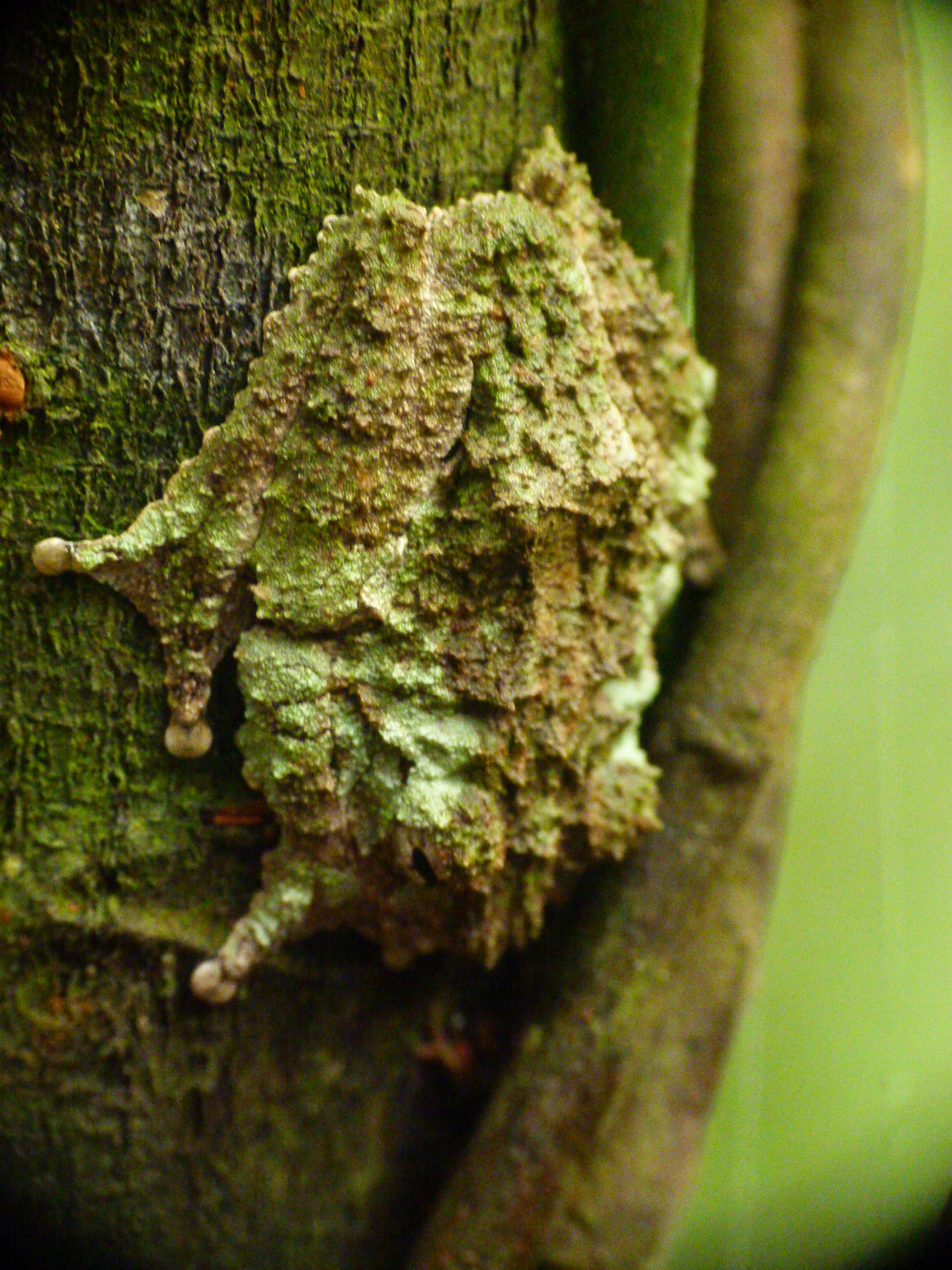
Dorsal view

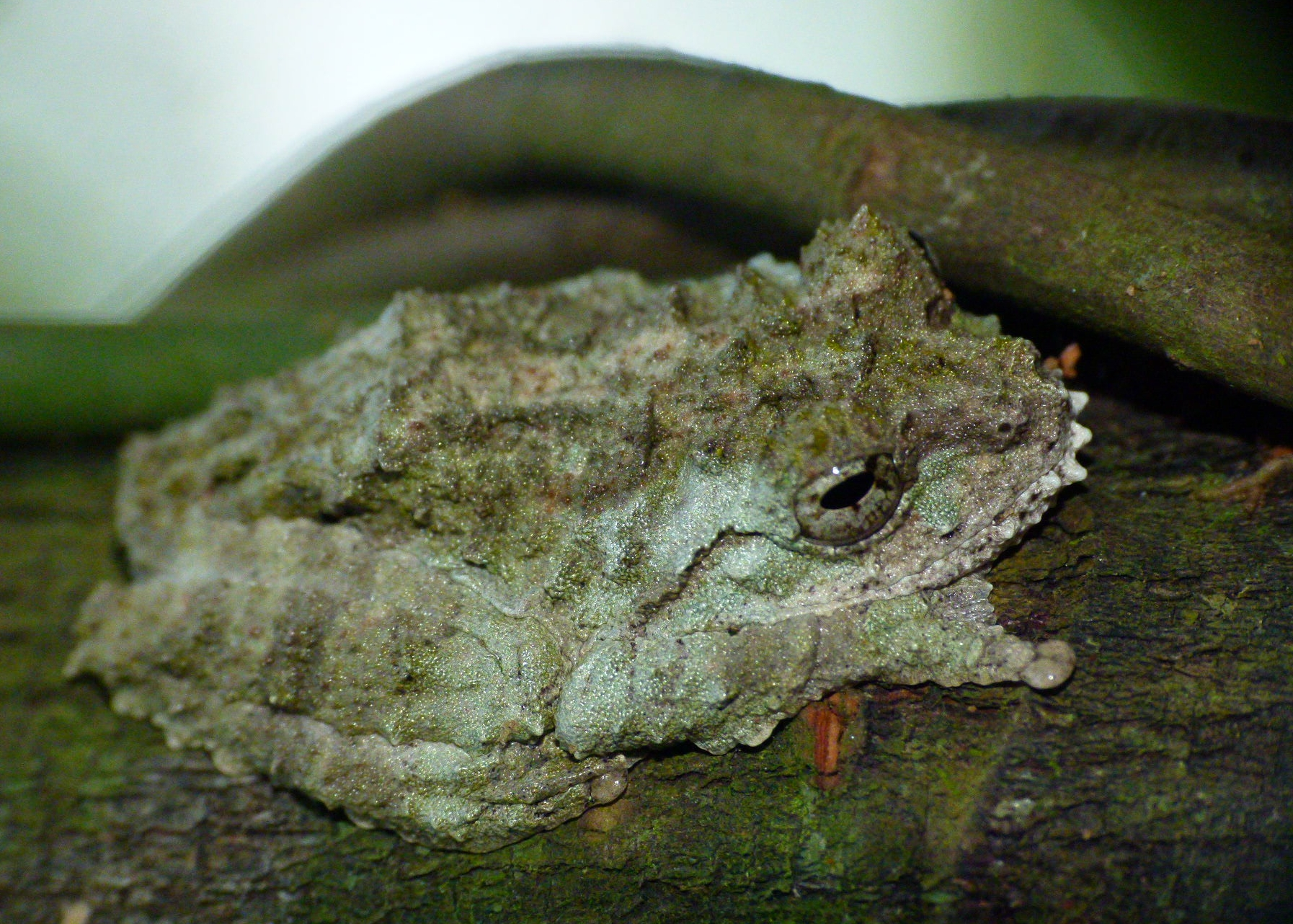
Lateral view

===== Raorchestes ochlandrae (ochlandrae reed bush frog) =====
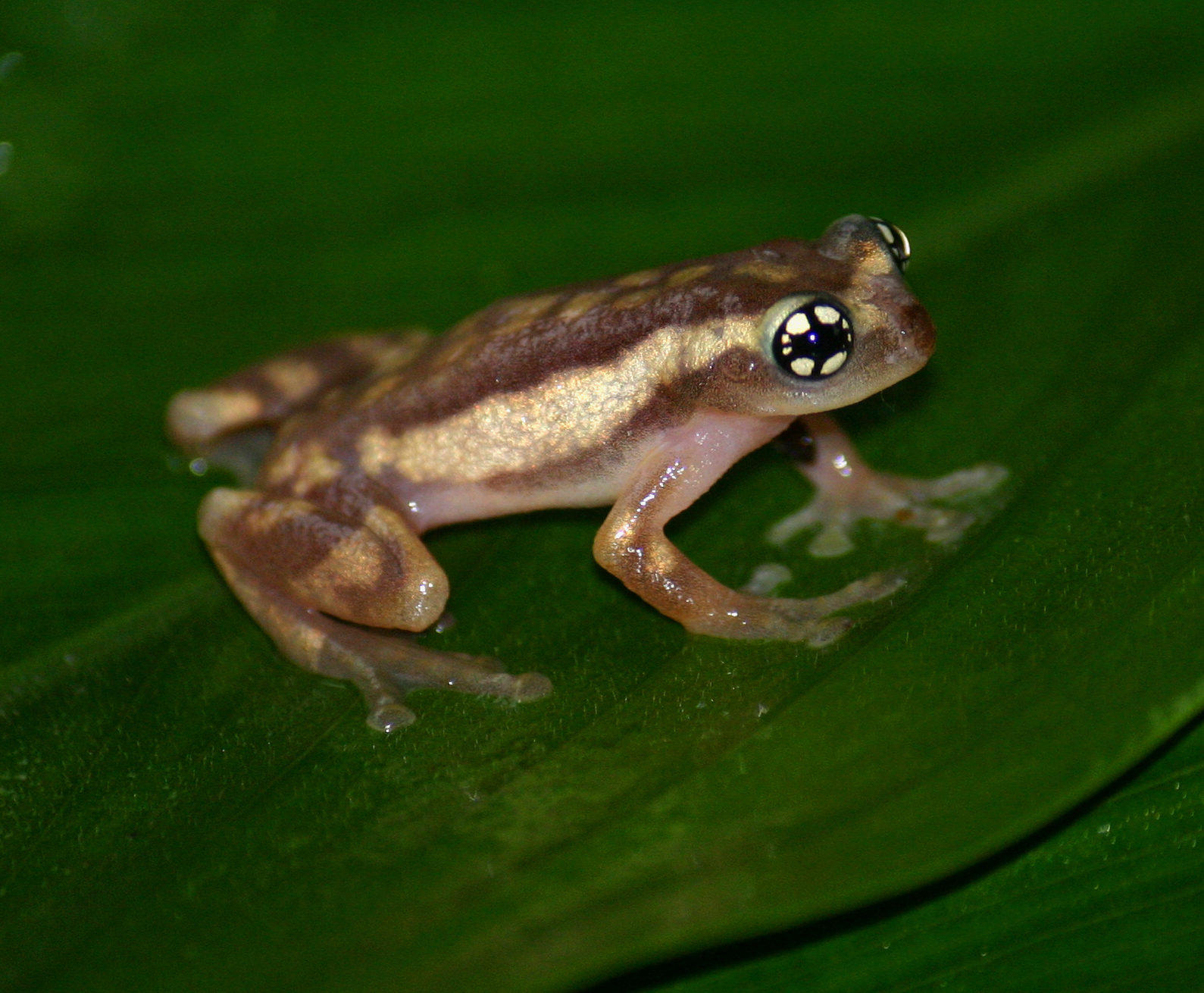
Lateral view

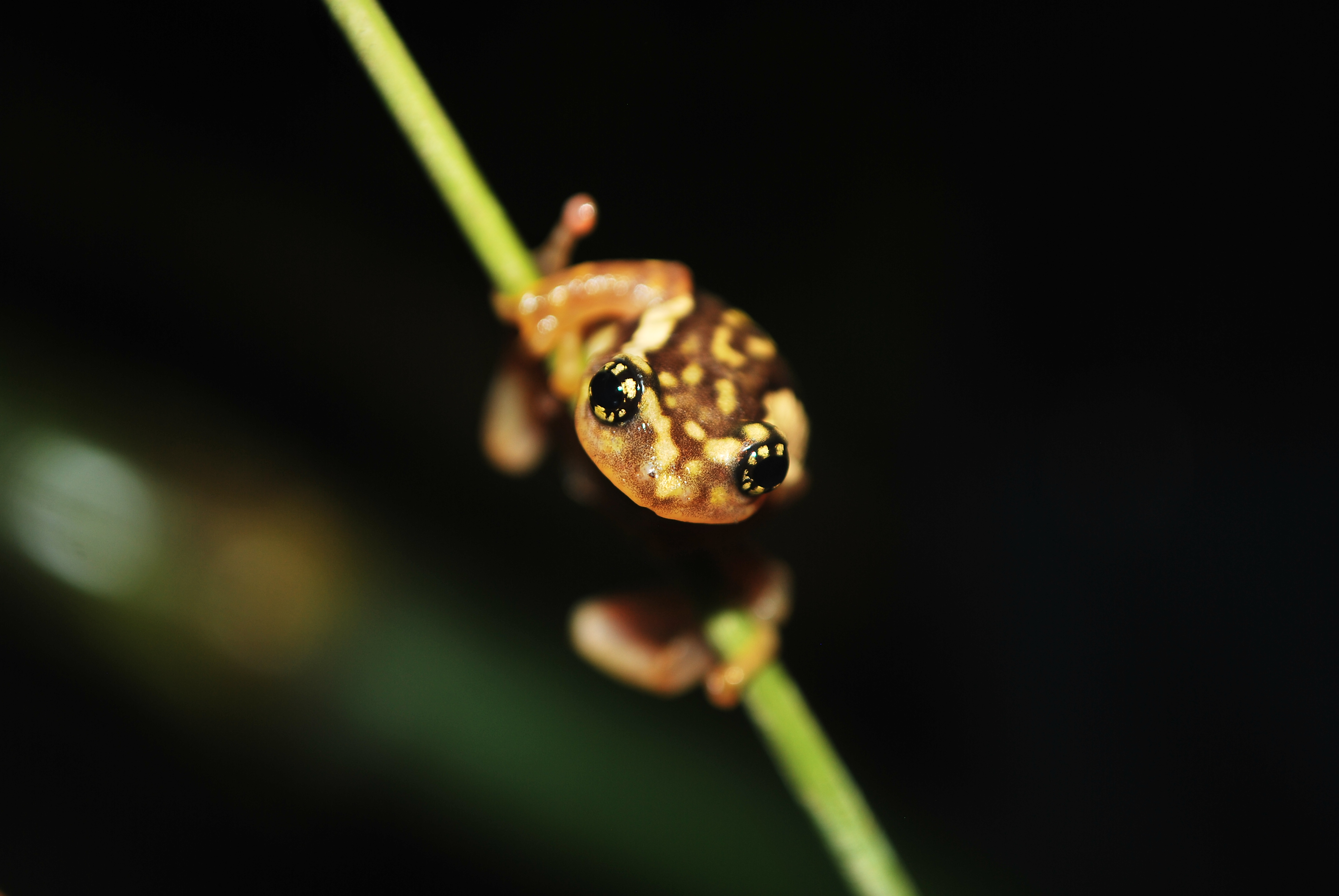
Front view

===== Raorchestes ponmudi (large Ponmudi bush frog) =====
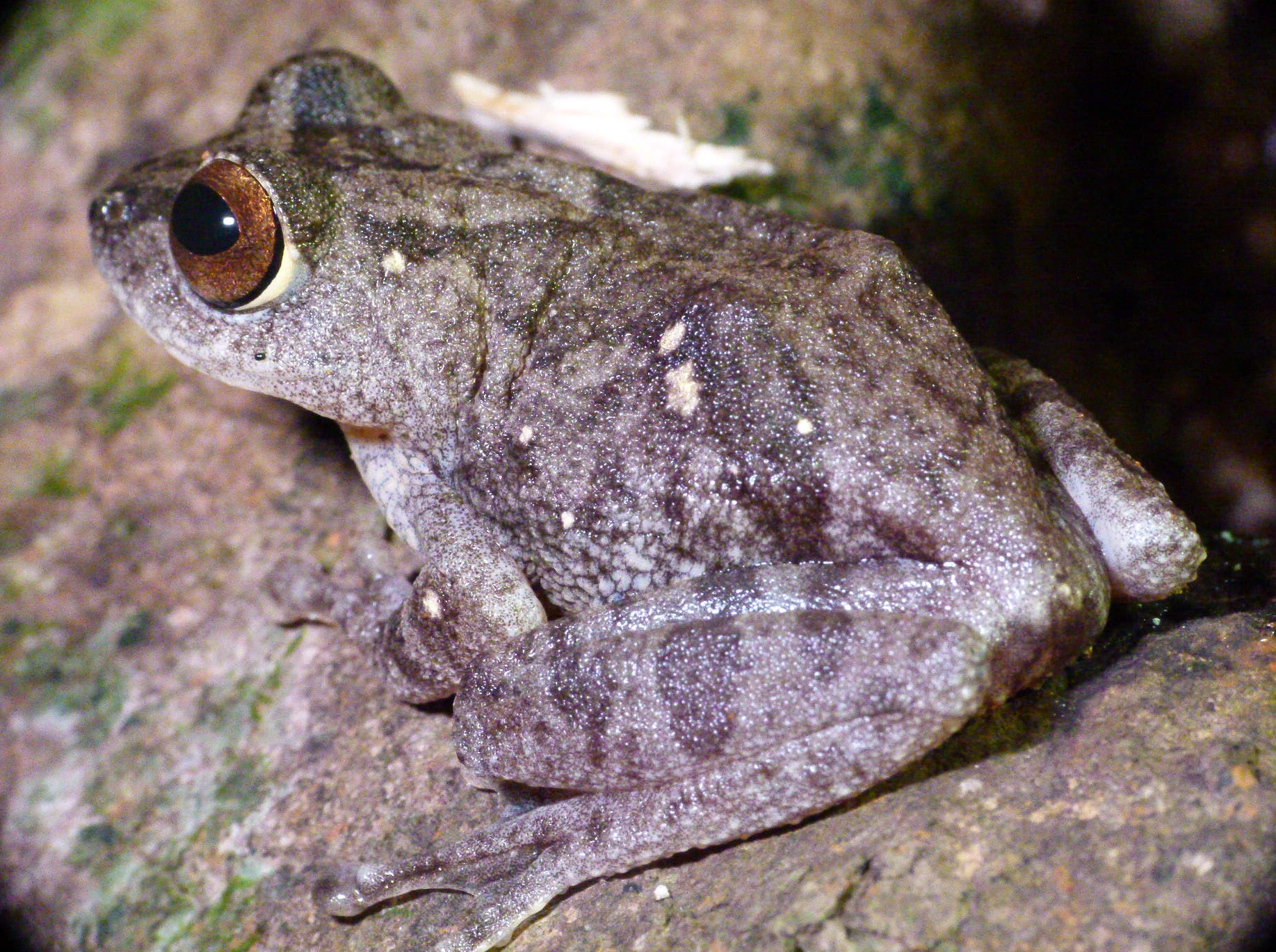
Dorsal view

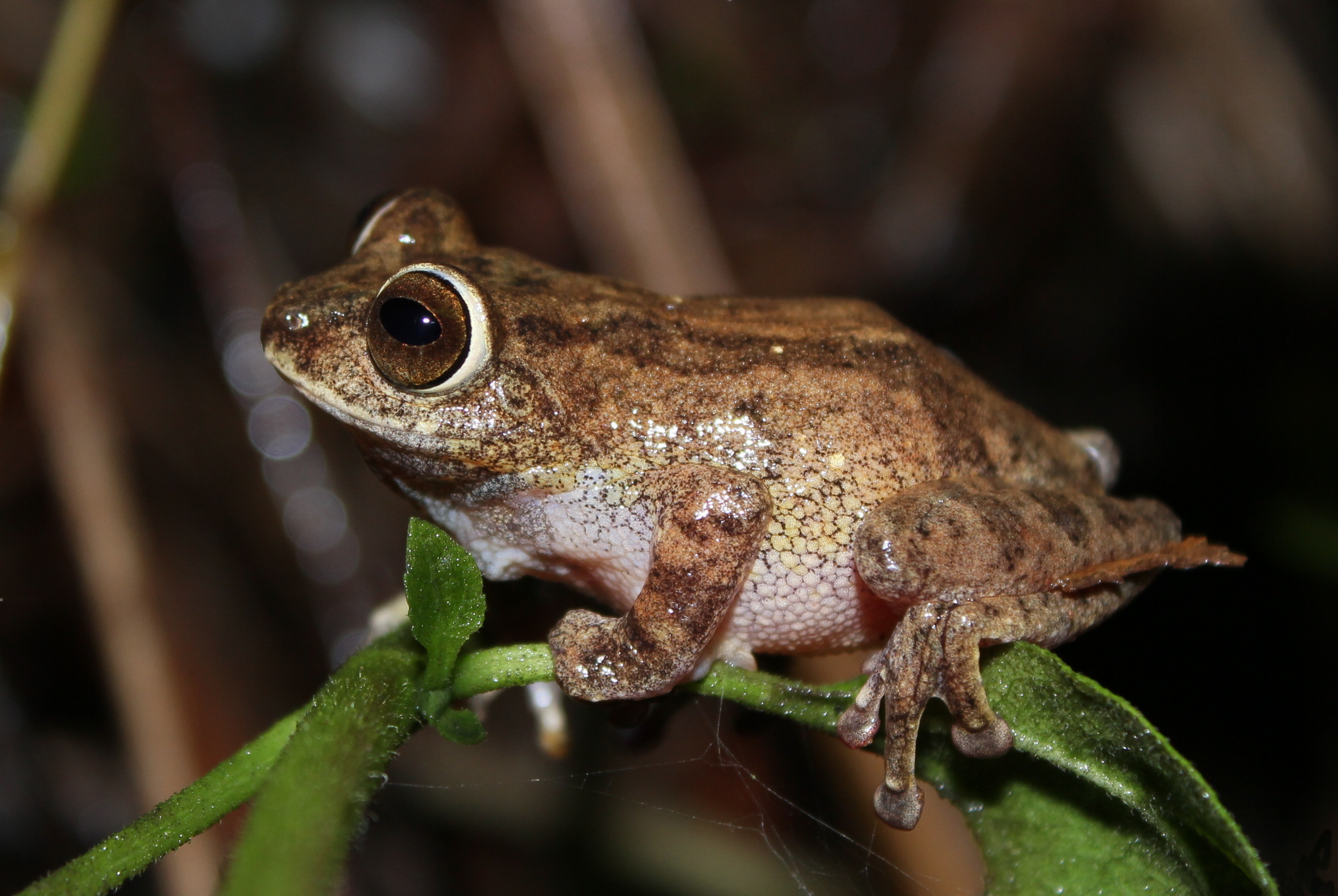
Lateral view

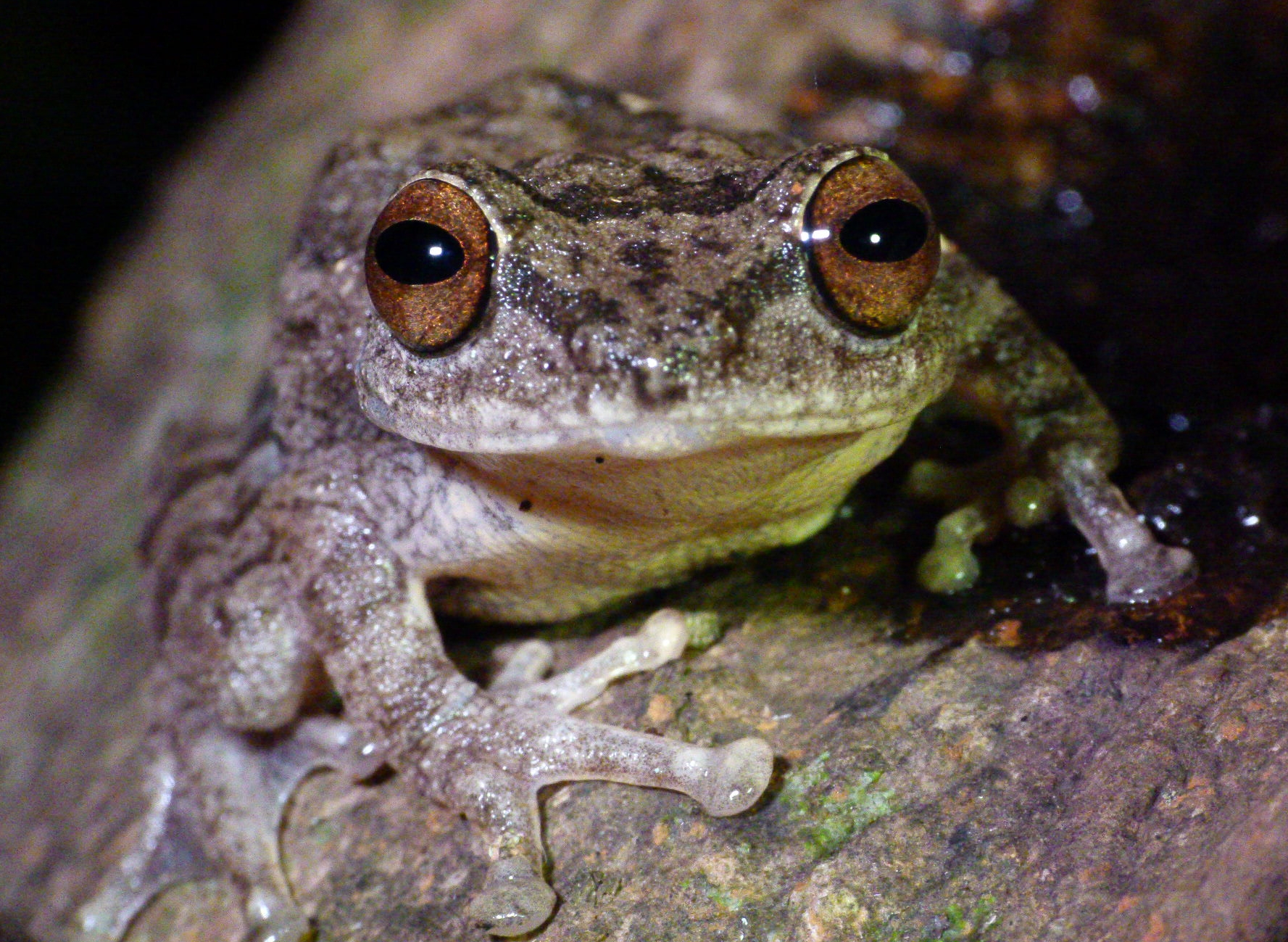
Front view

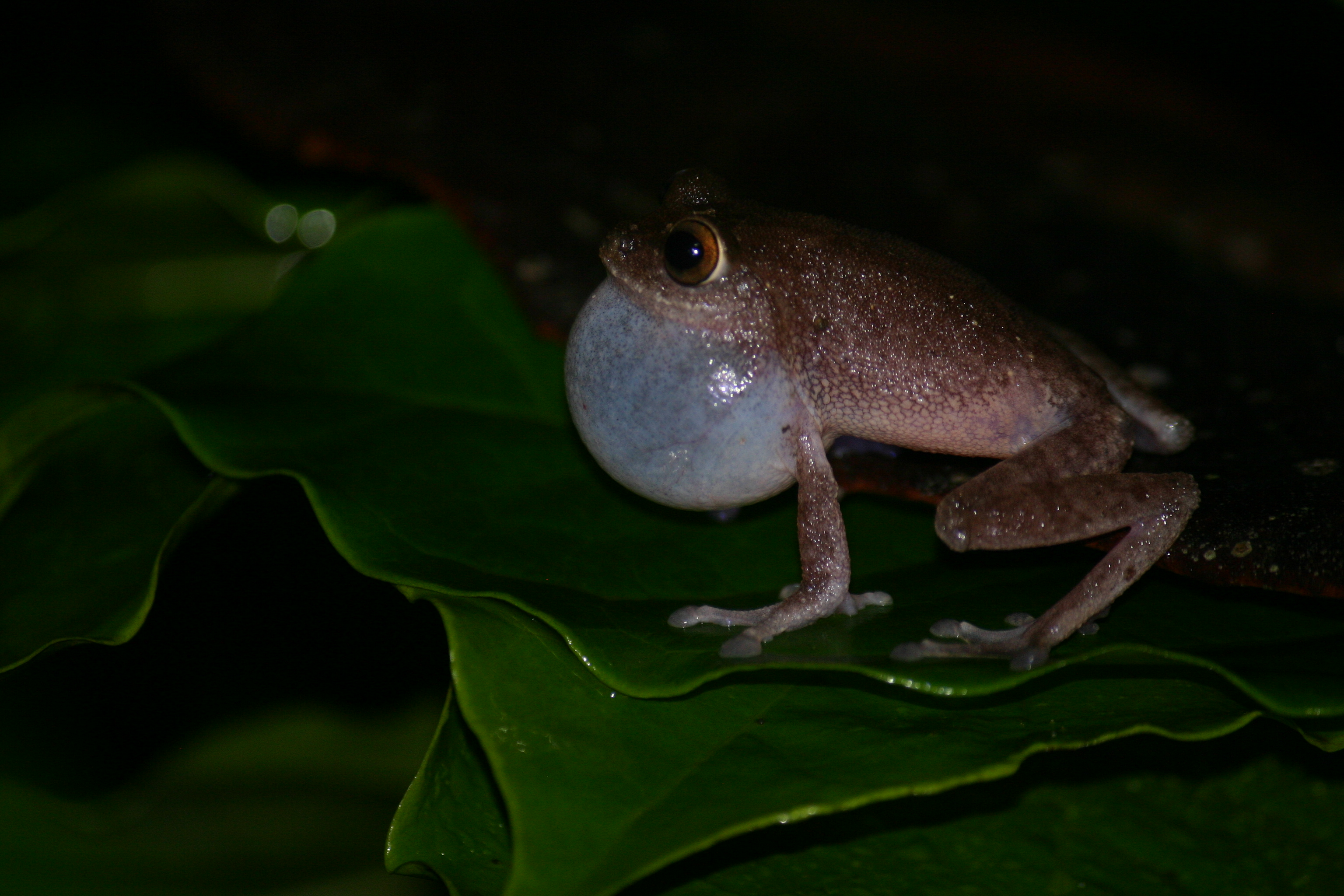
Calling

===== Raorchestes ravii (Ravi's bush frog) =====
Lateral view

===== Raorchestes resplendens (resplendent shrub frog) =====
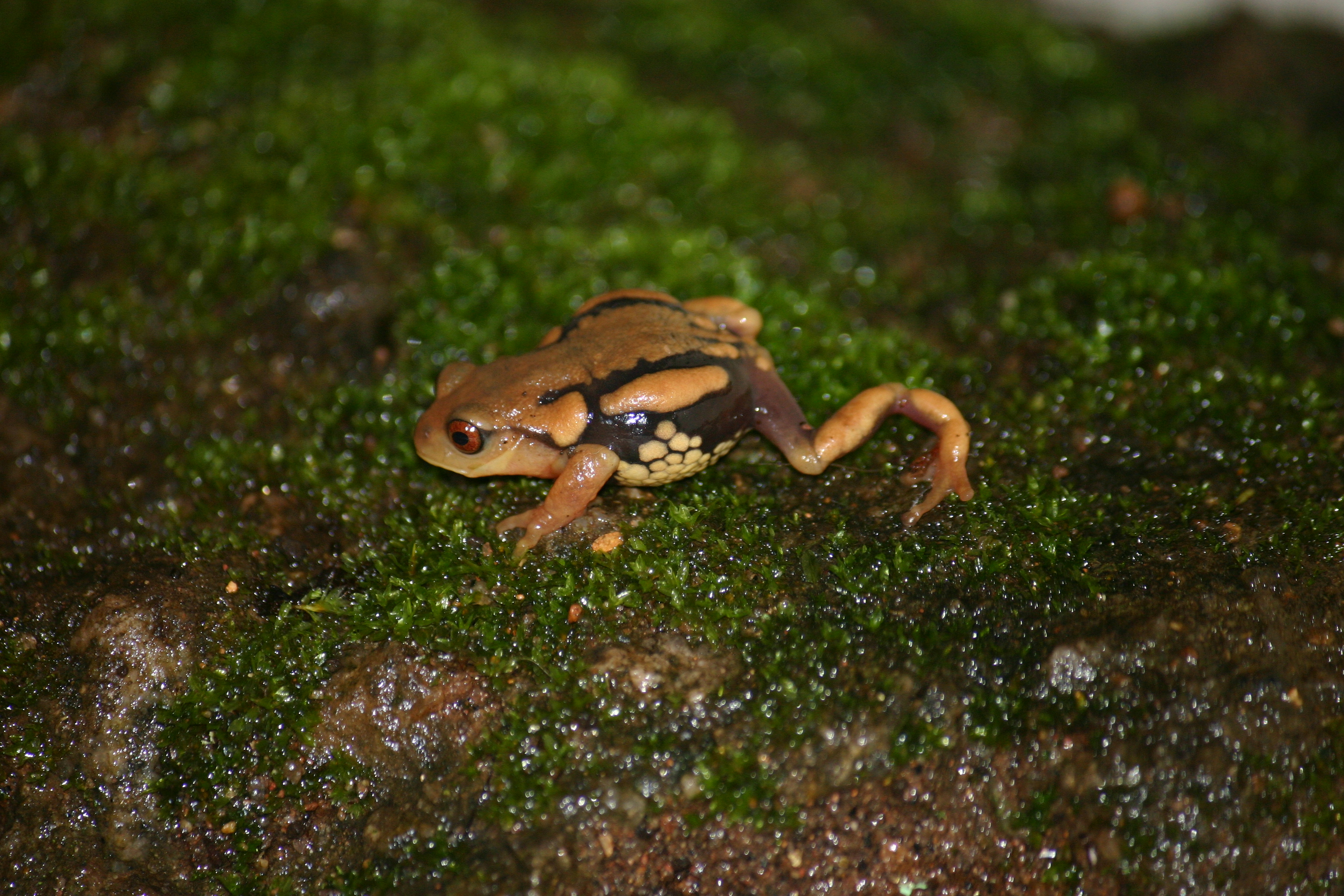
Dorsal view

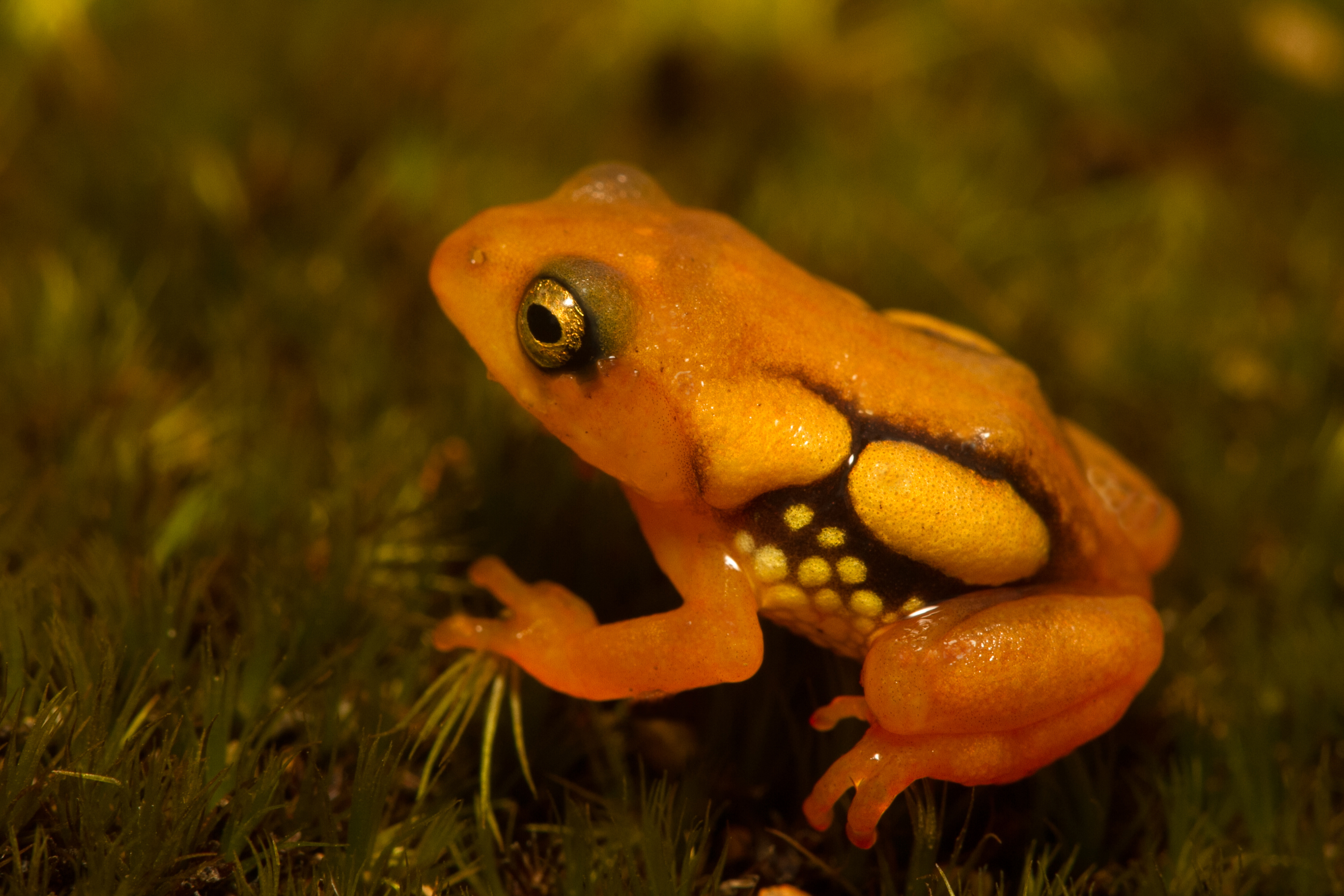
Lateral view

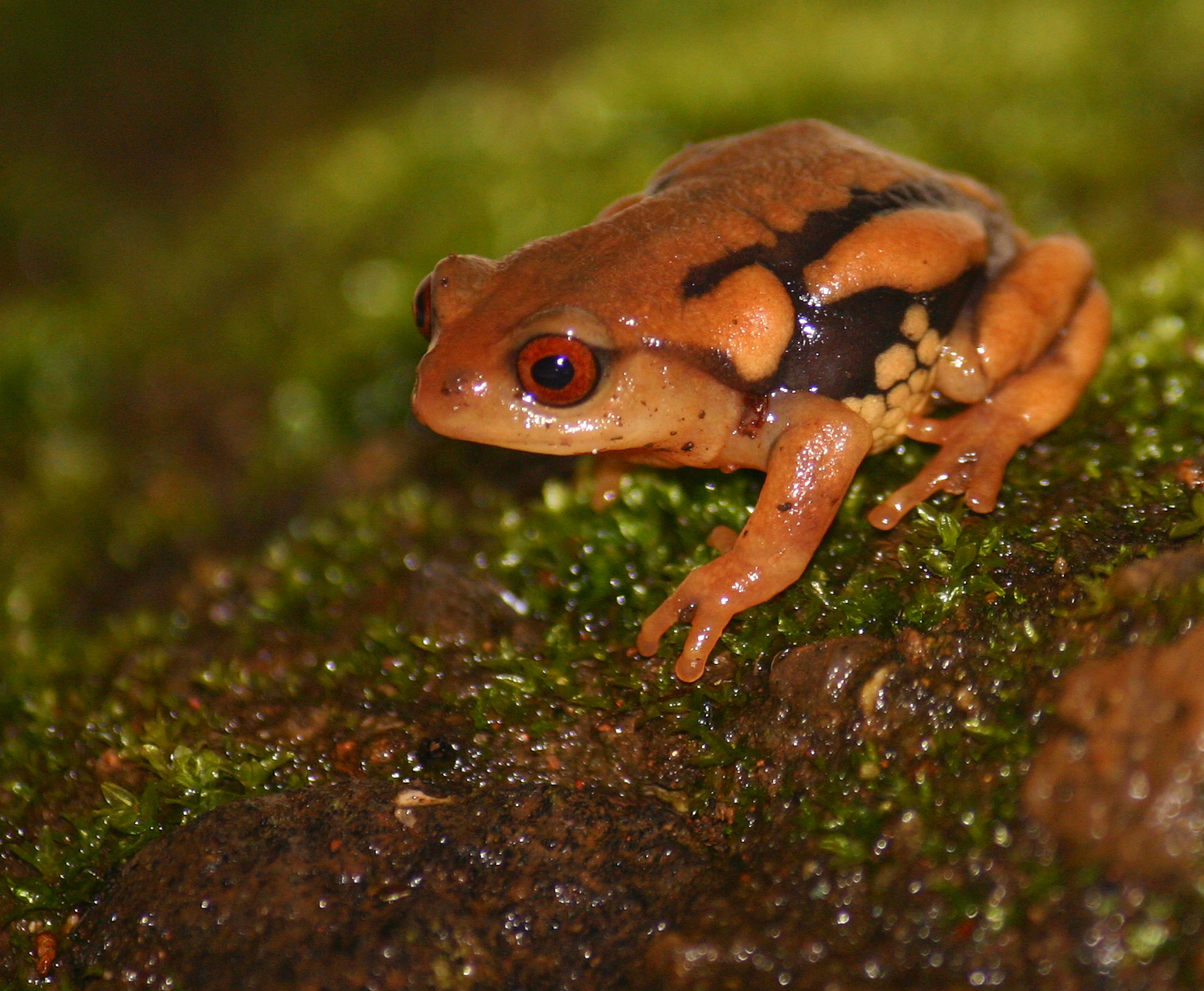
Front view

===== Raorchestes signatus (star-eyed bush frog) =====
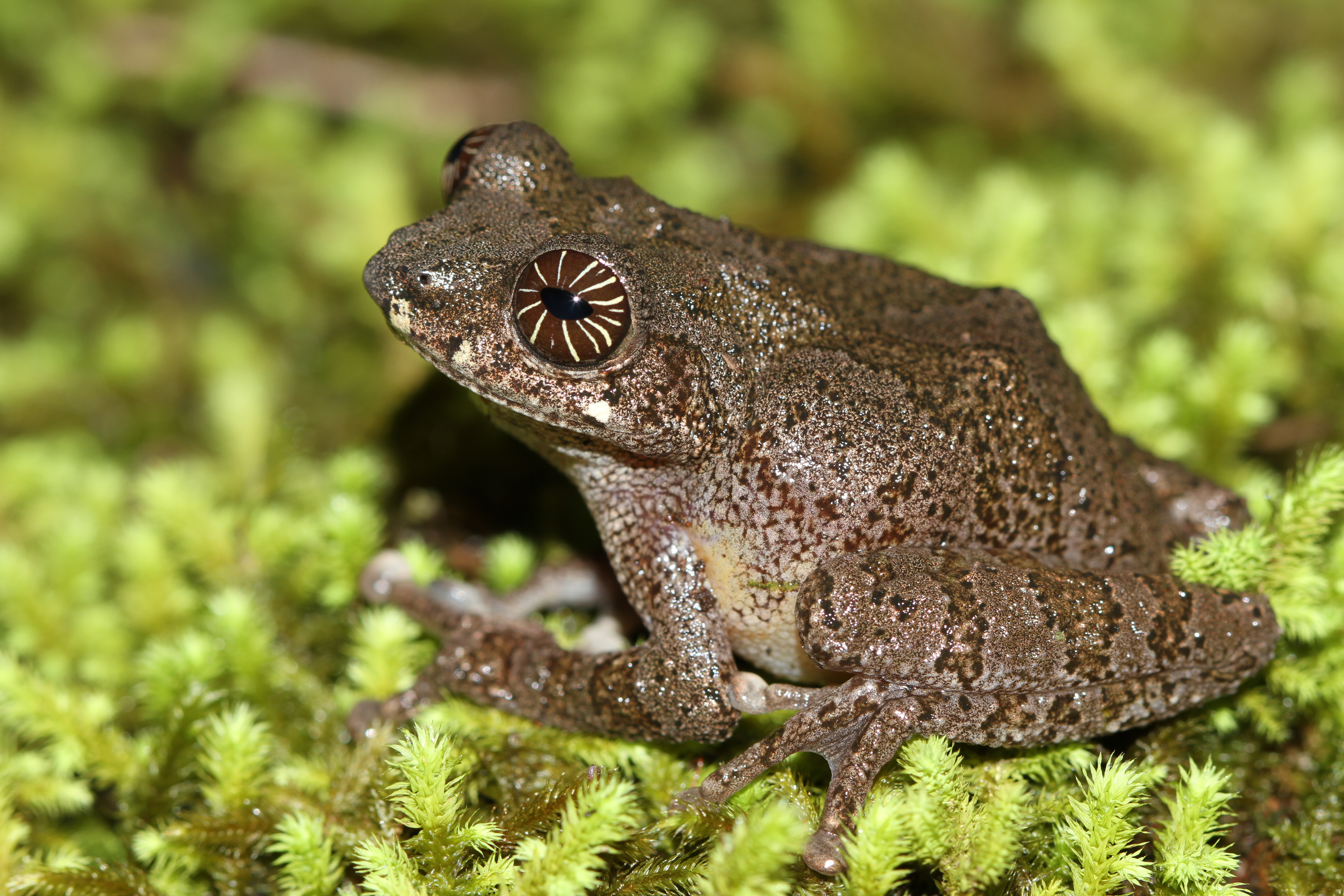
Lateral view

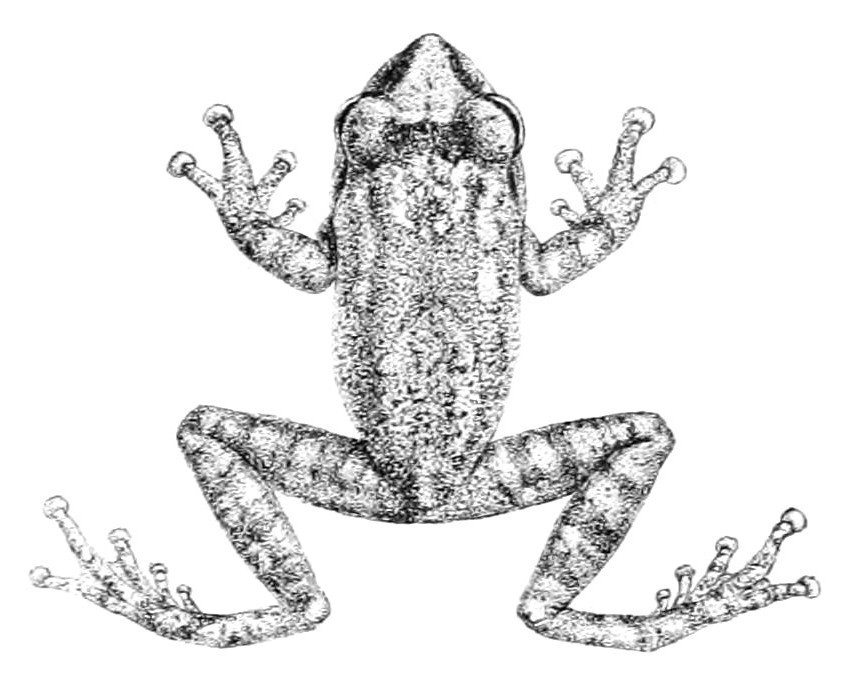
Illustration

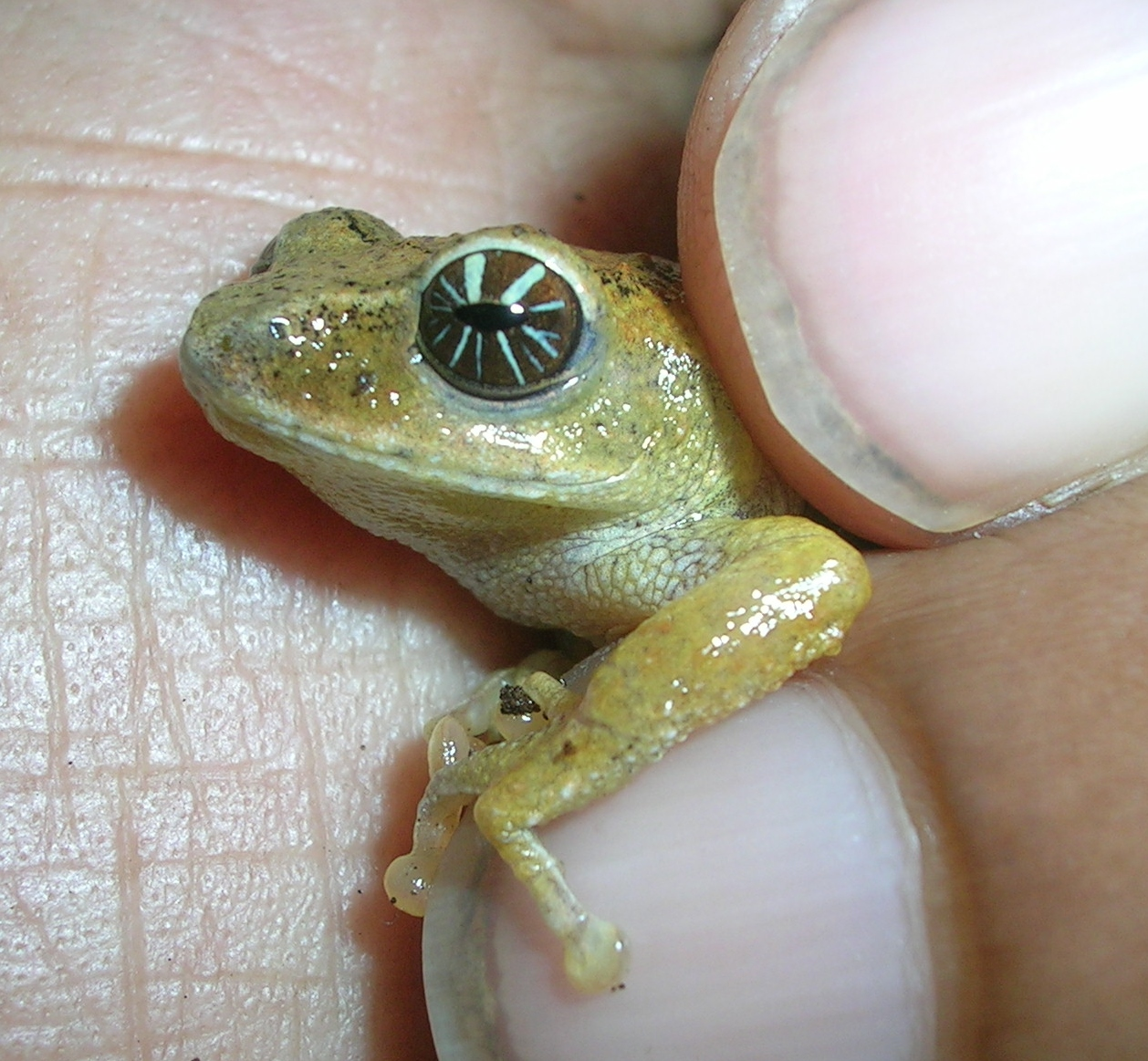
Front view

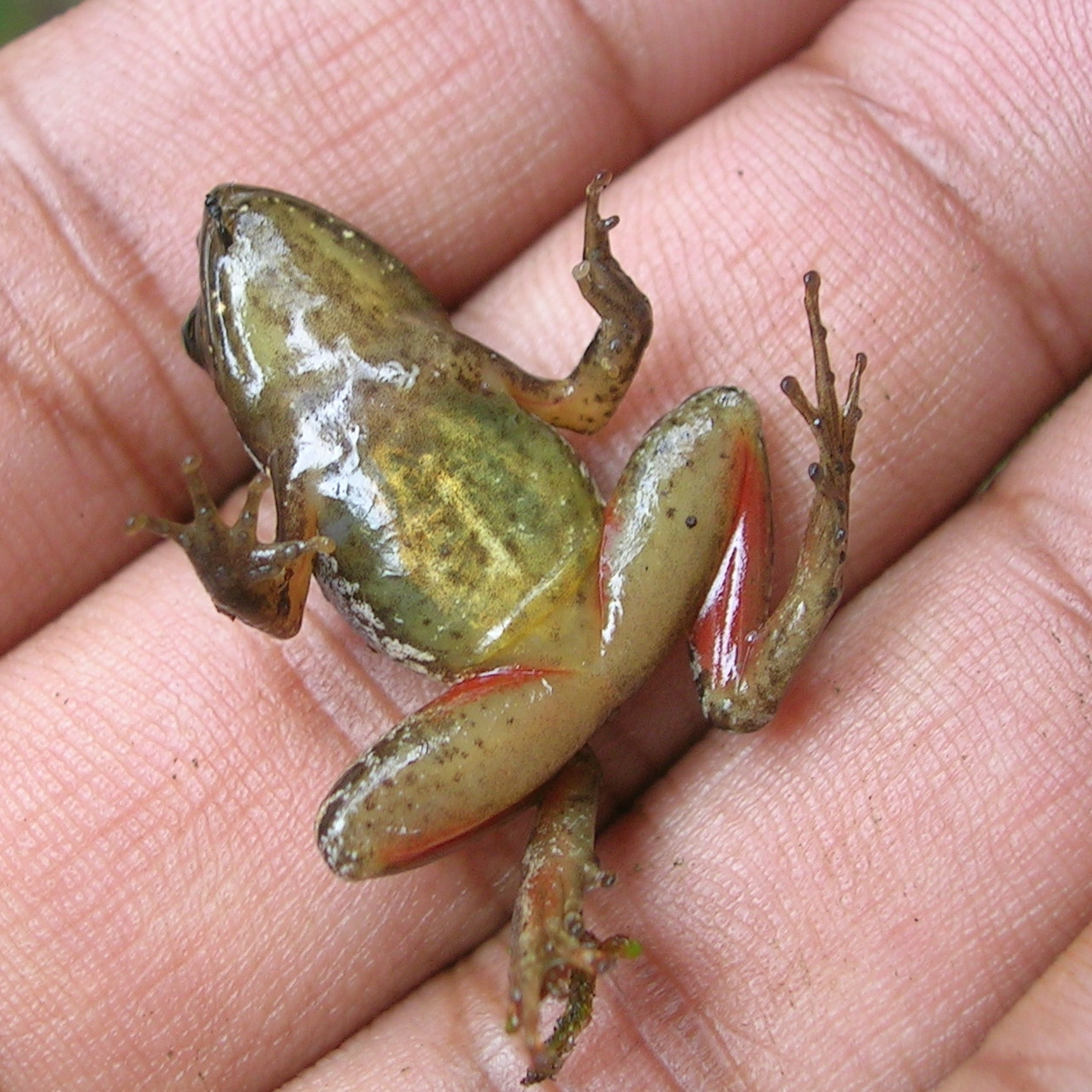
Ventral view

===== Raorchestes sushili (Sushil's bush frog) =====
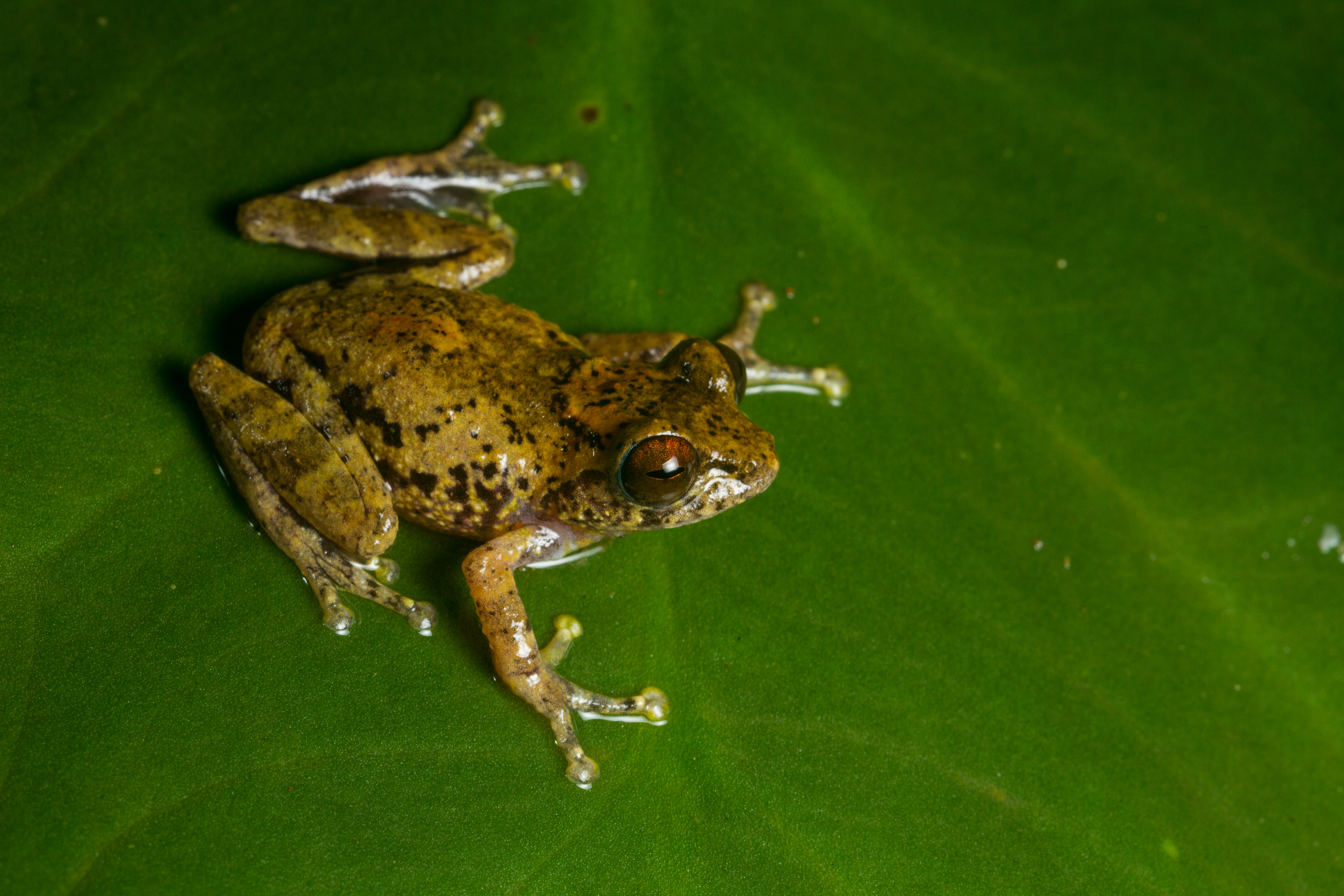
Dorsal view

===== Raorchestes tinniens (Nilgiri bush frog) =====
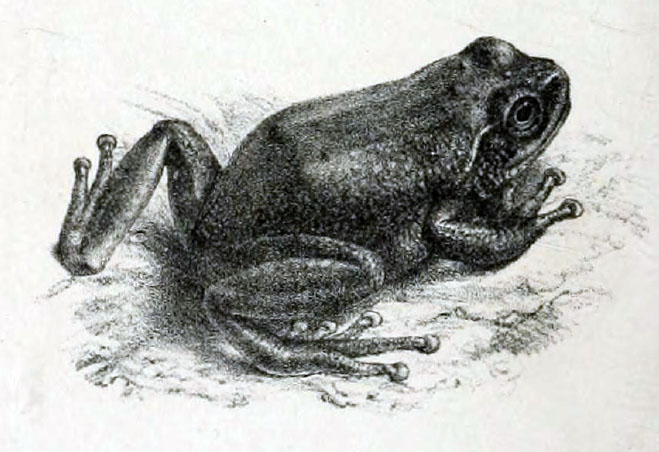
Illustration

Dorsal view

===== Raorchestes travancoricus (Travancore bush frog) =====
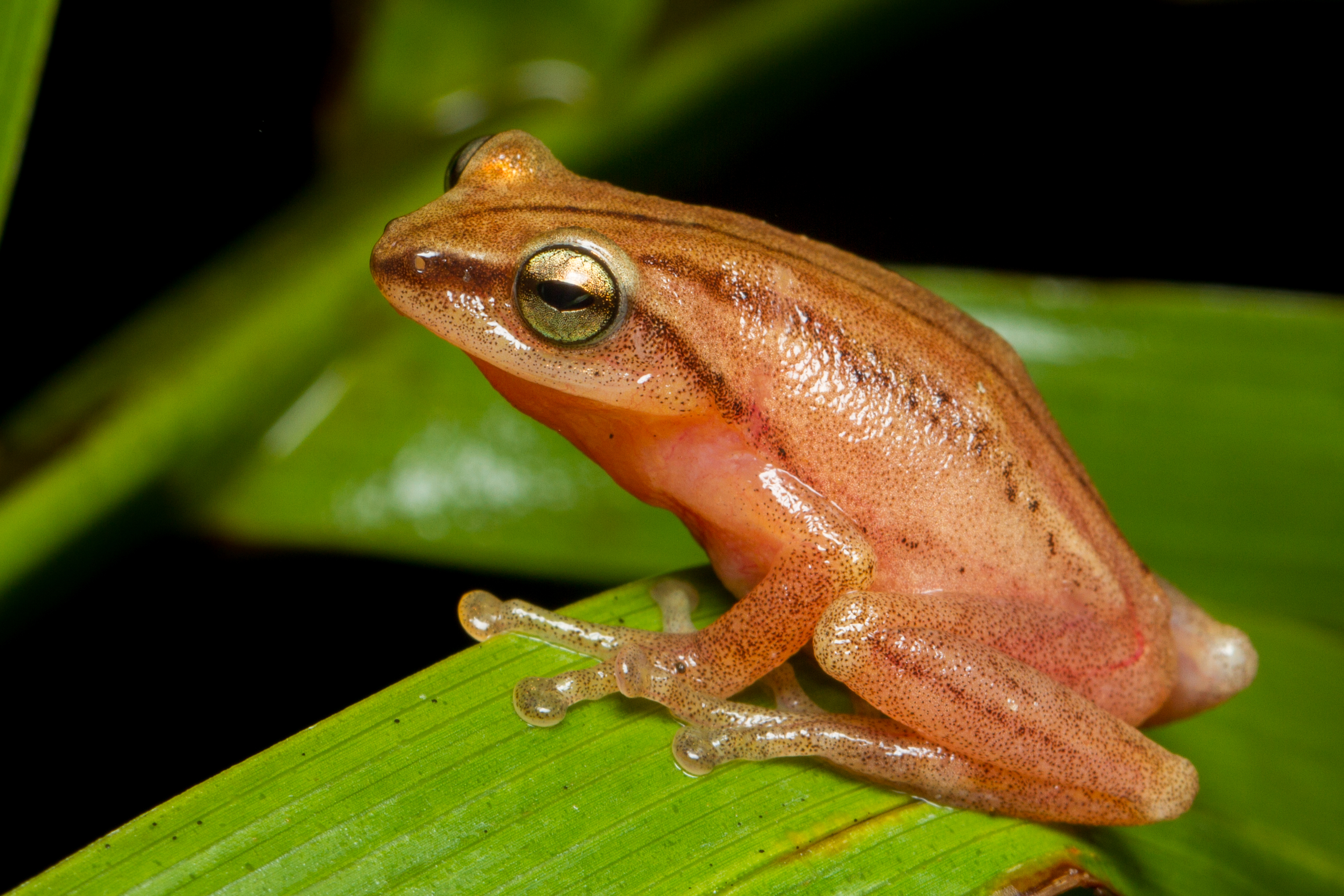
Lateral view

===== Raorchestes tuberohumerus (Kudremukh bush frog) =====
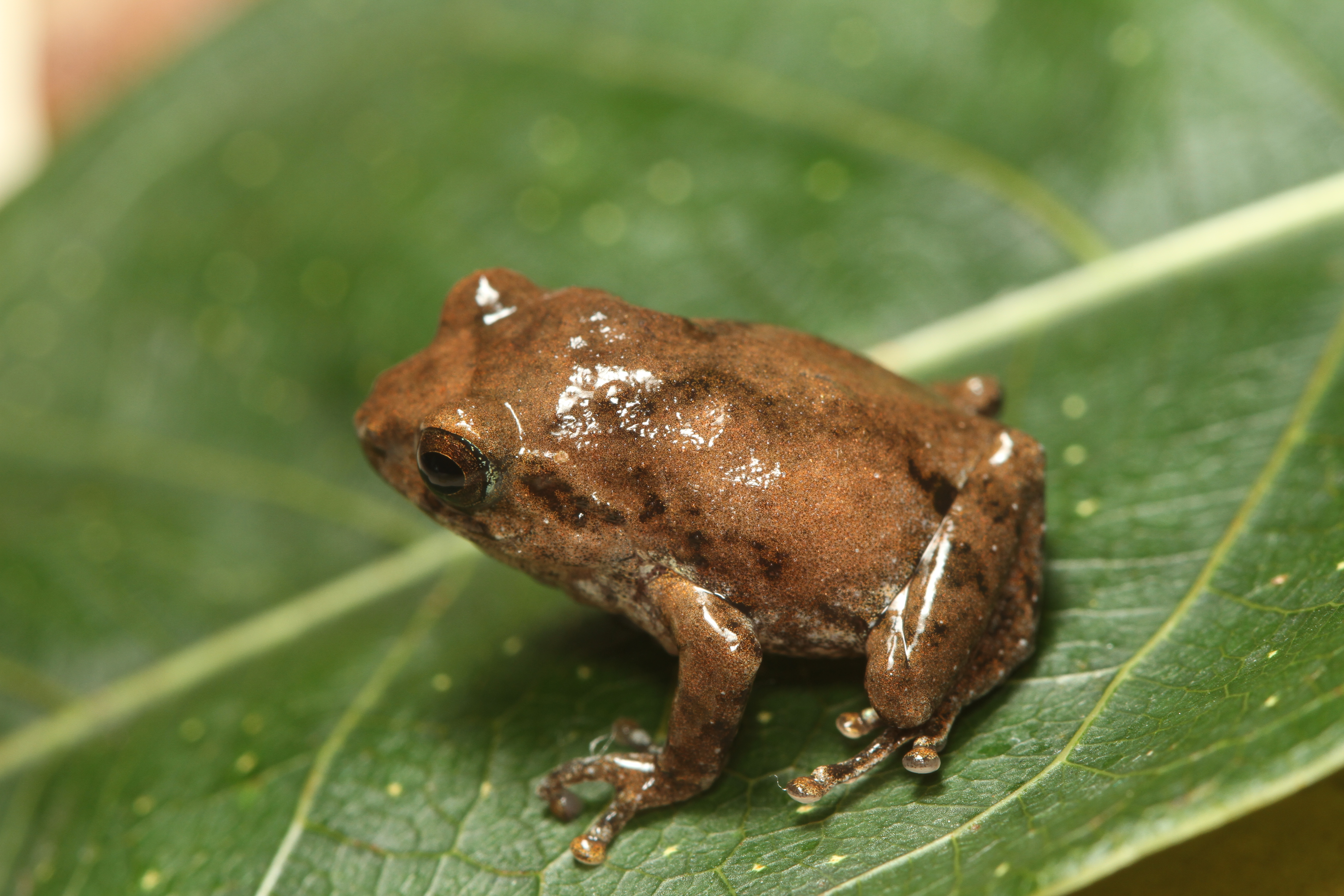
Dorsal view

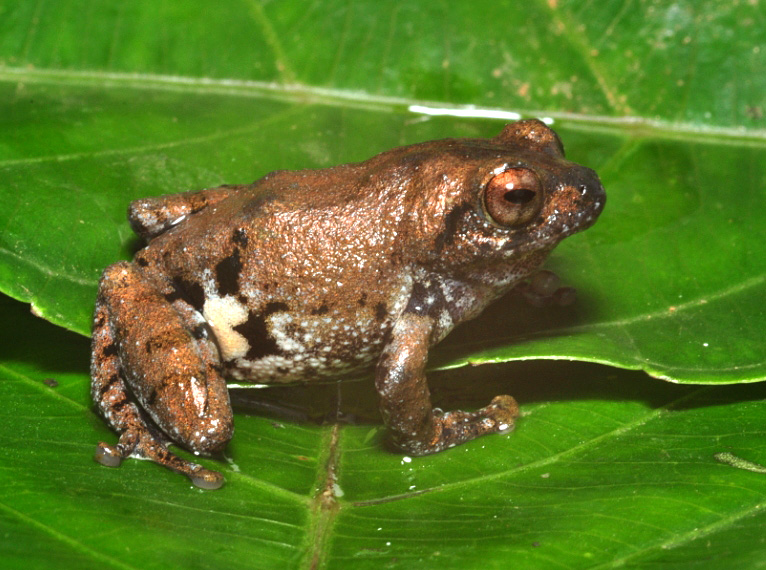
Lateral view

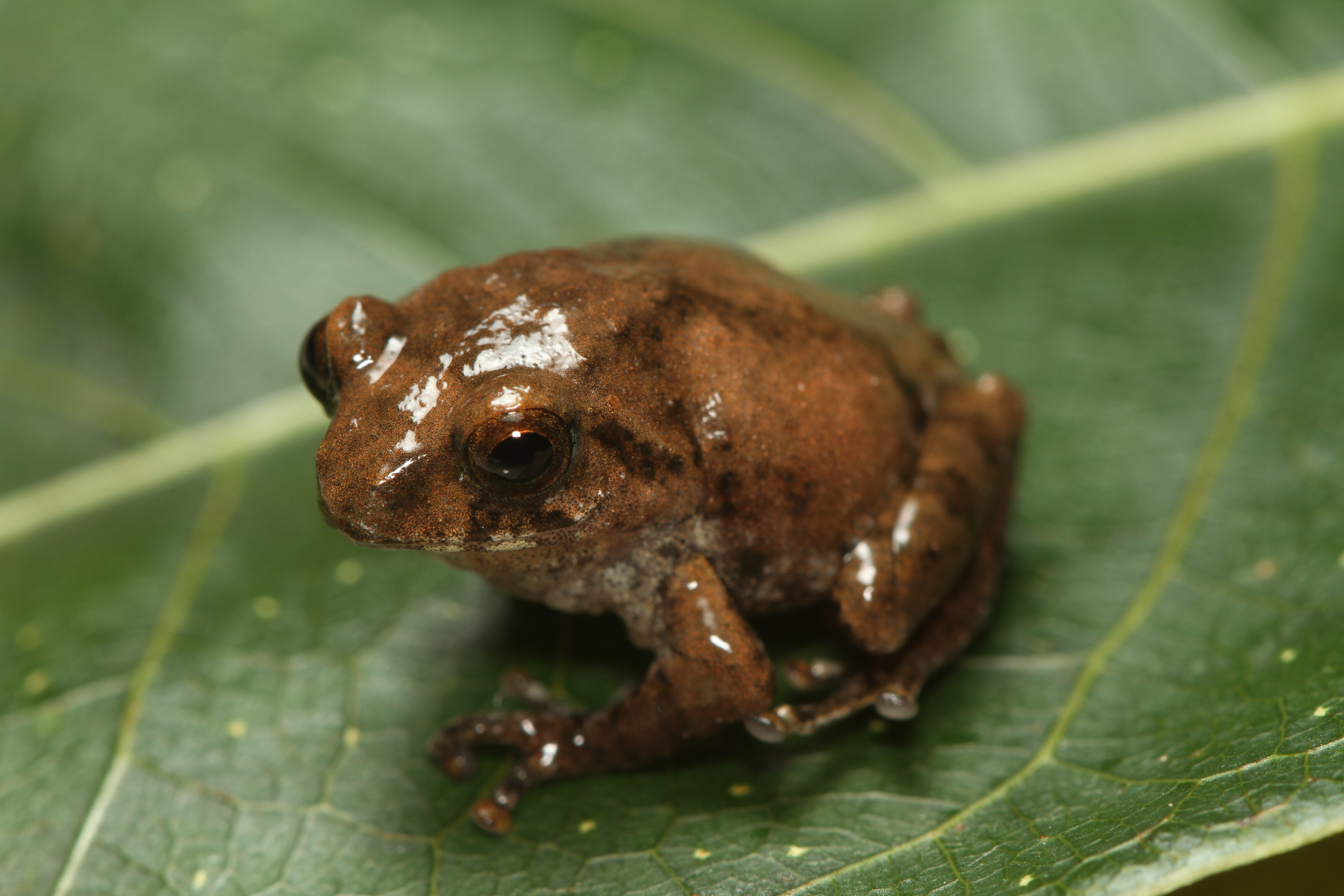
Front view

===== Raorchestes uthamani (Uthaman's reed bush frog) =====
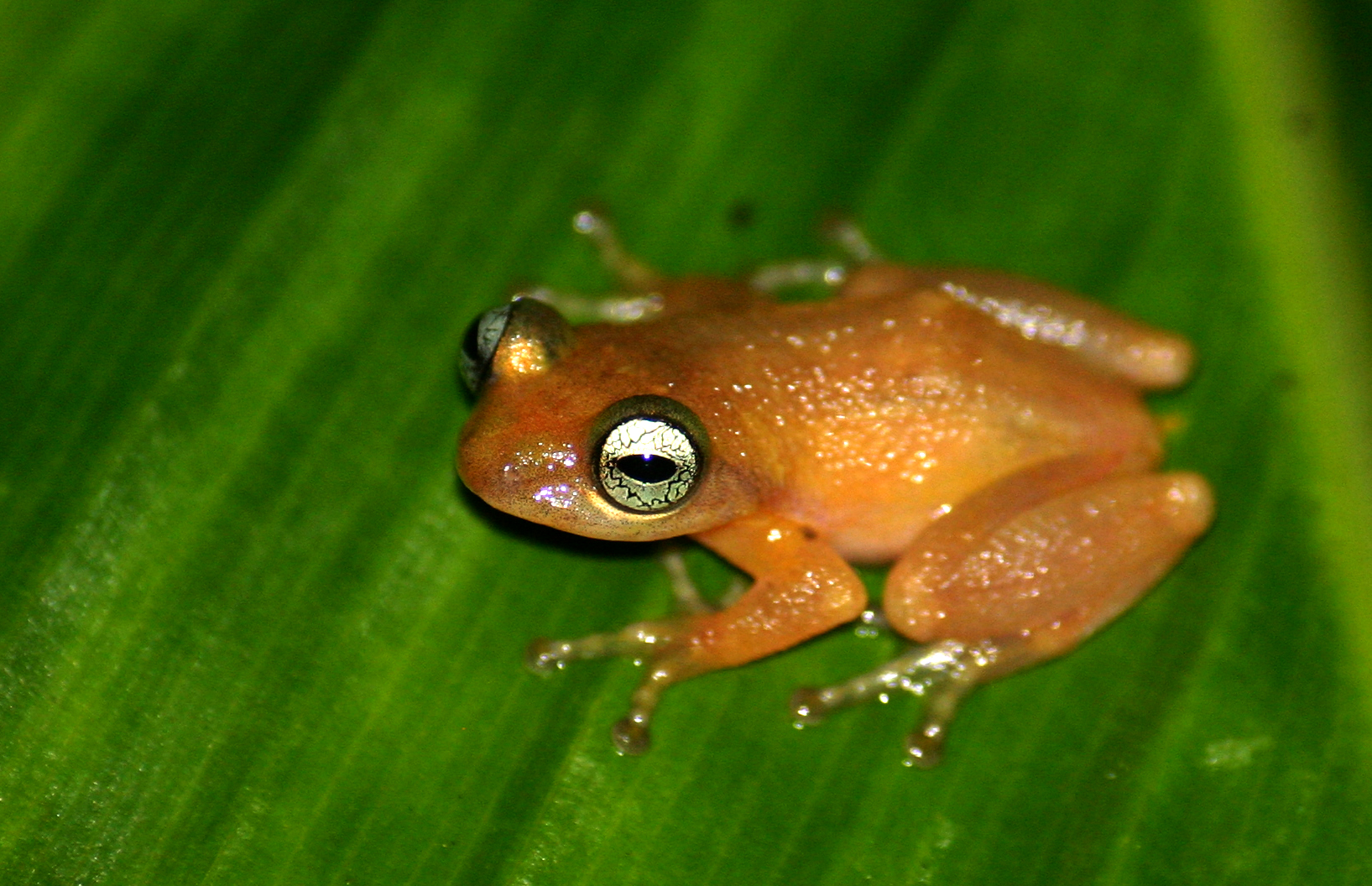
Lateral view

==== Genus: Rhacophorus ====
===== Rhacophorus calcadensis (Kalakad gliding frog) =====
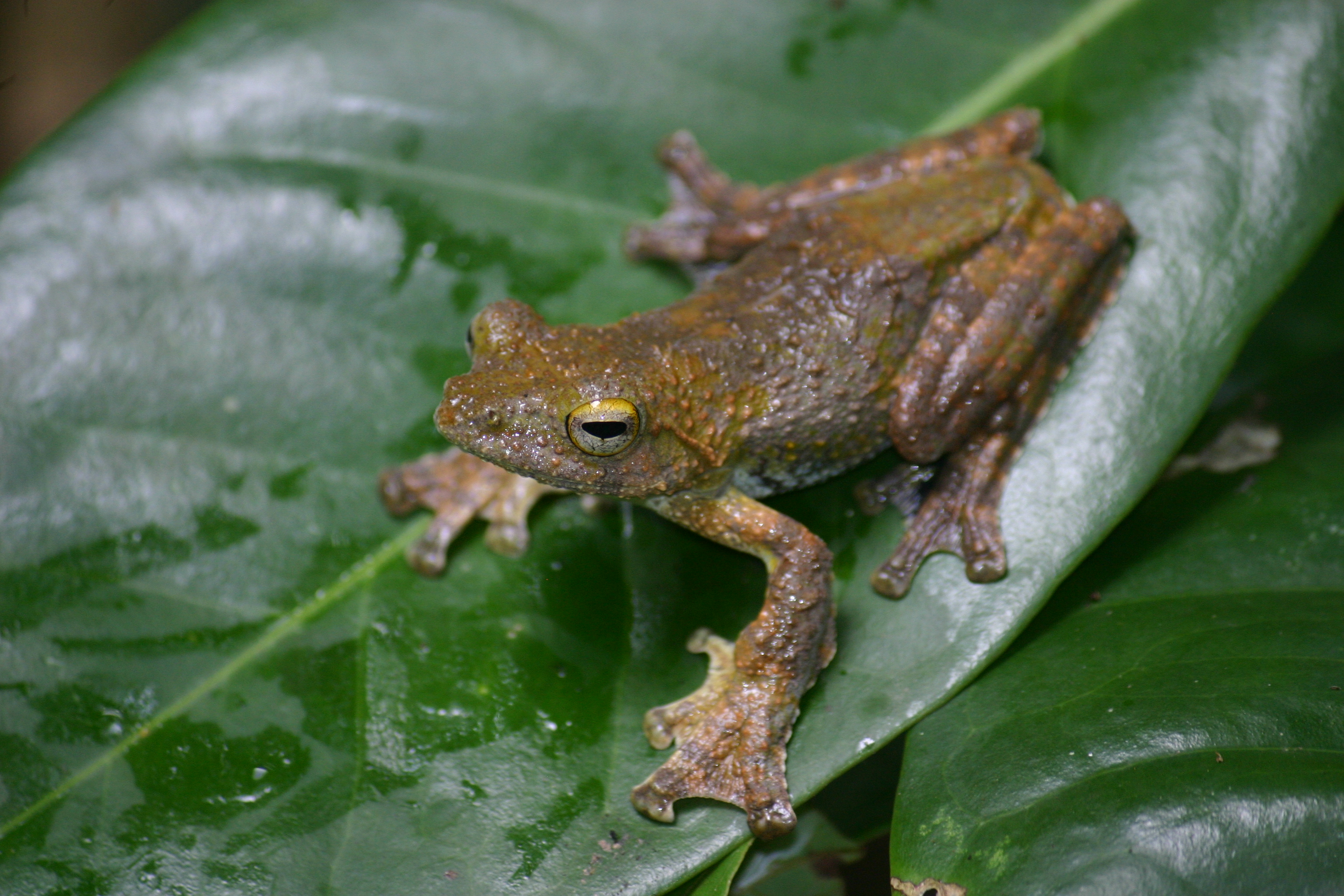
Dorsal view

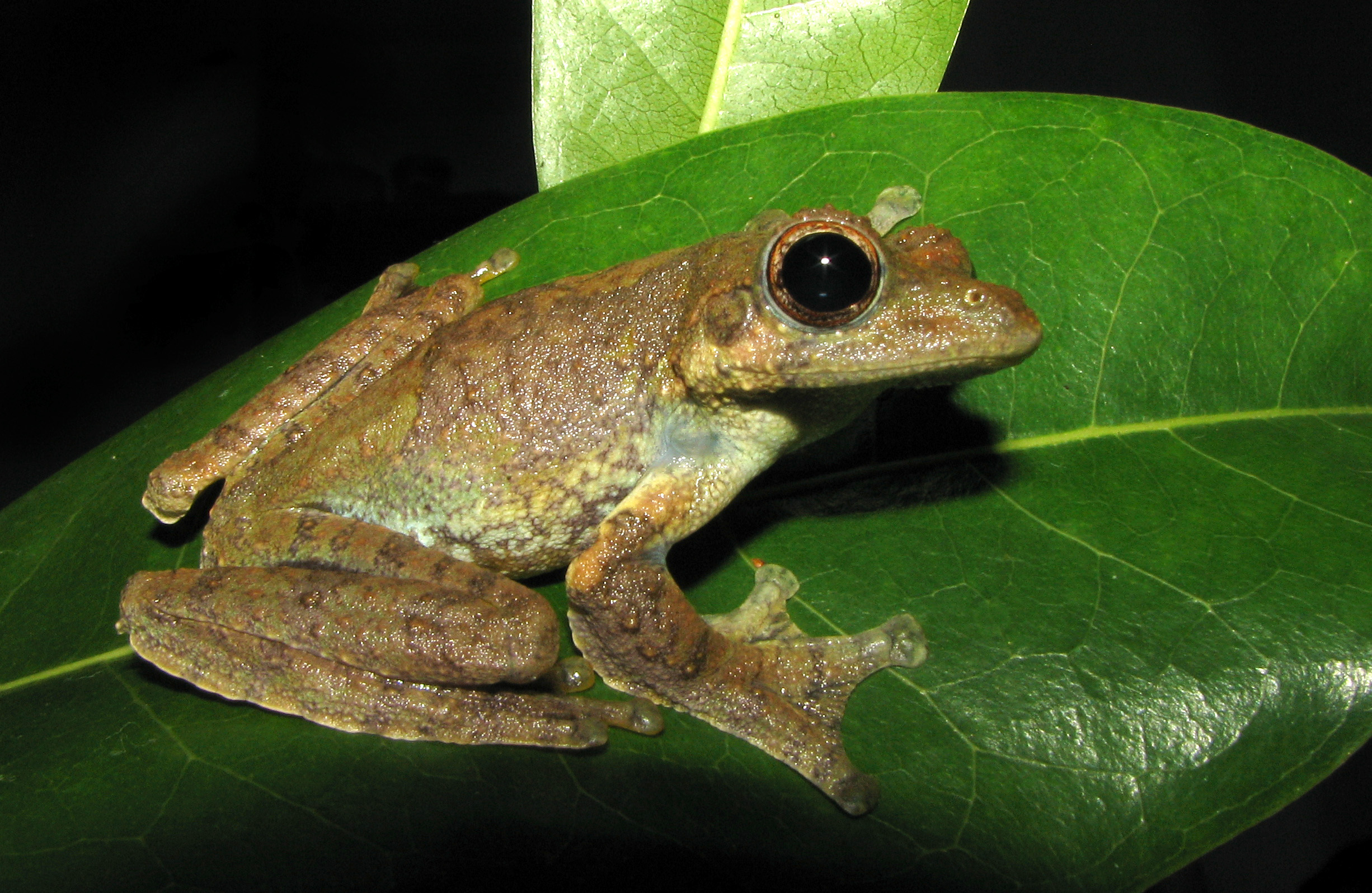
Lateral view

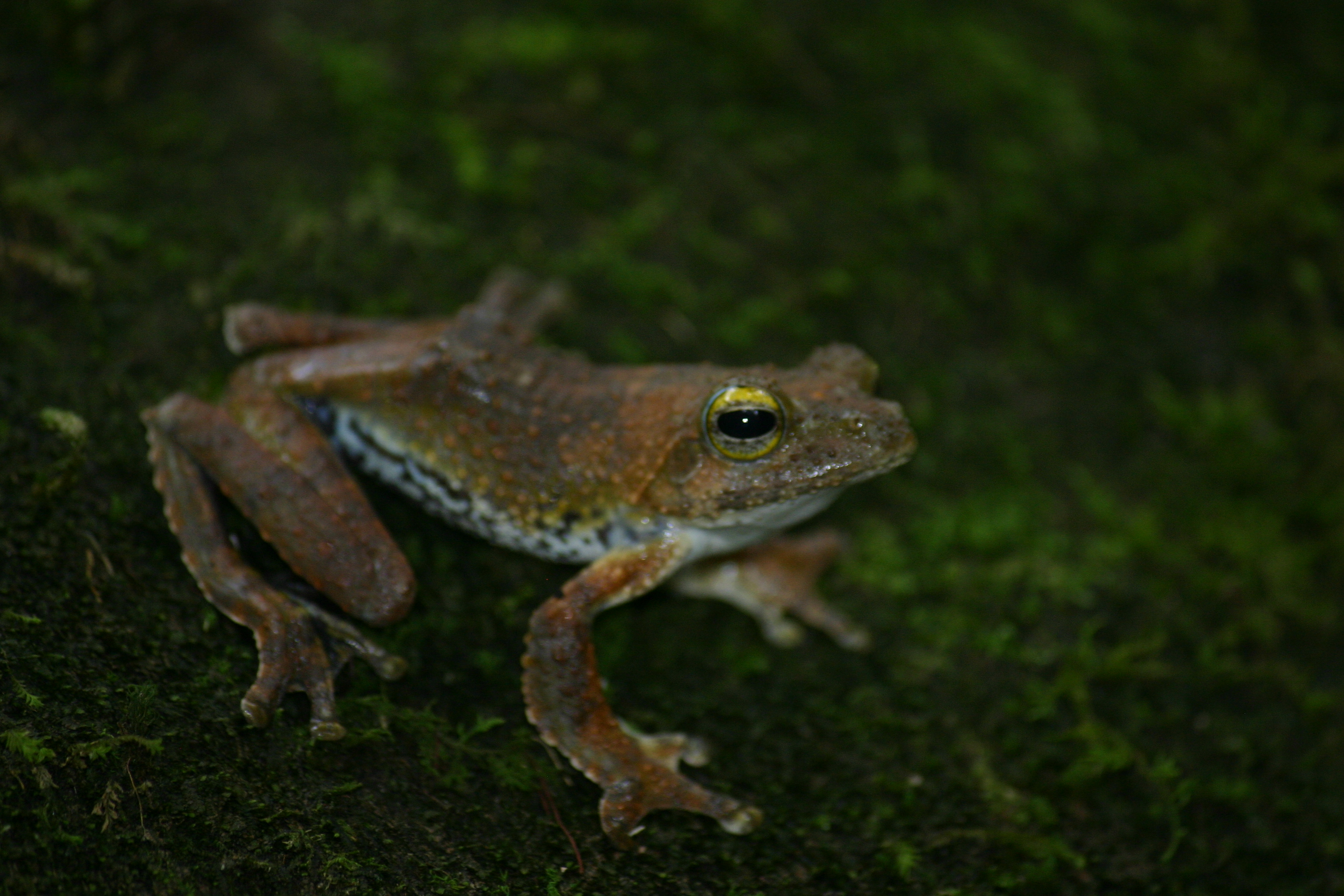
Front view

===== Rhacophorus lateralis (small tree frog) =====
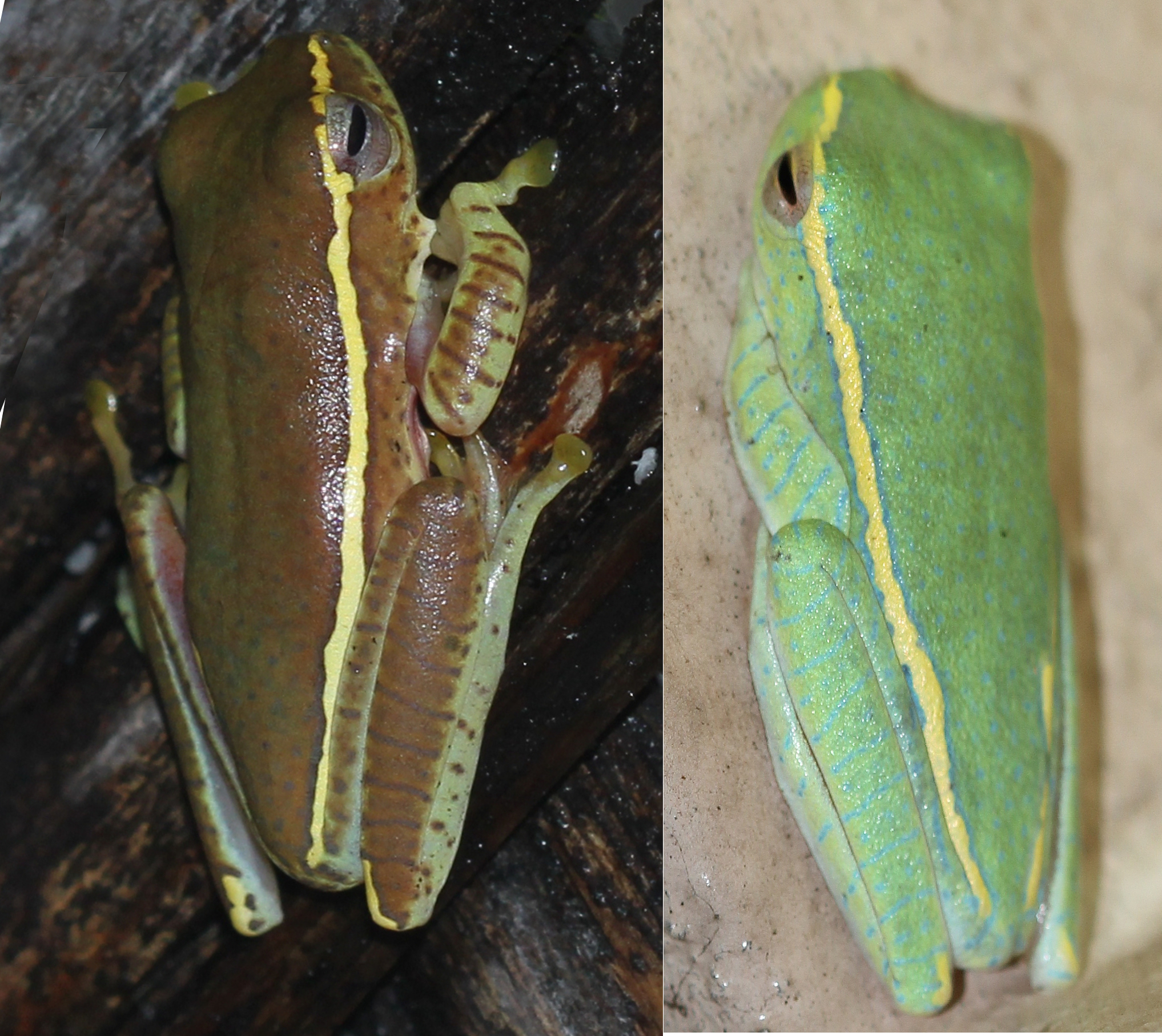
Dorsal view

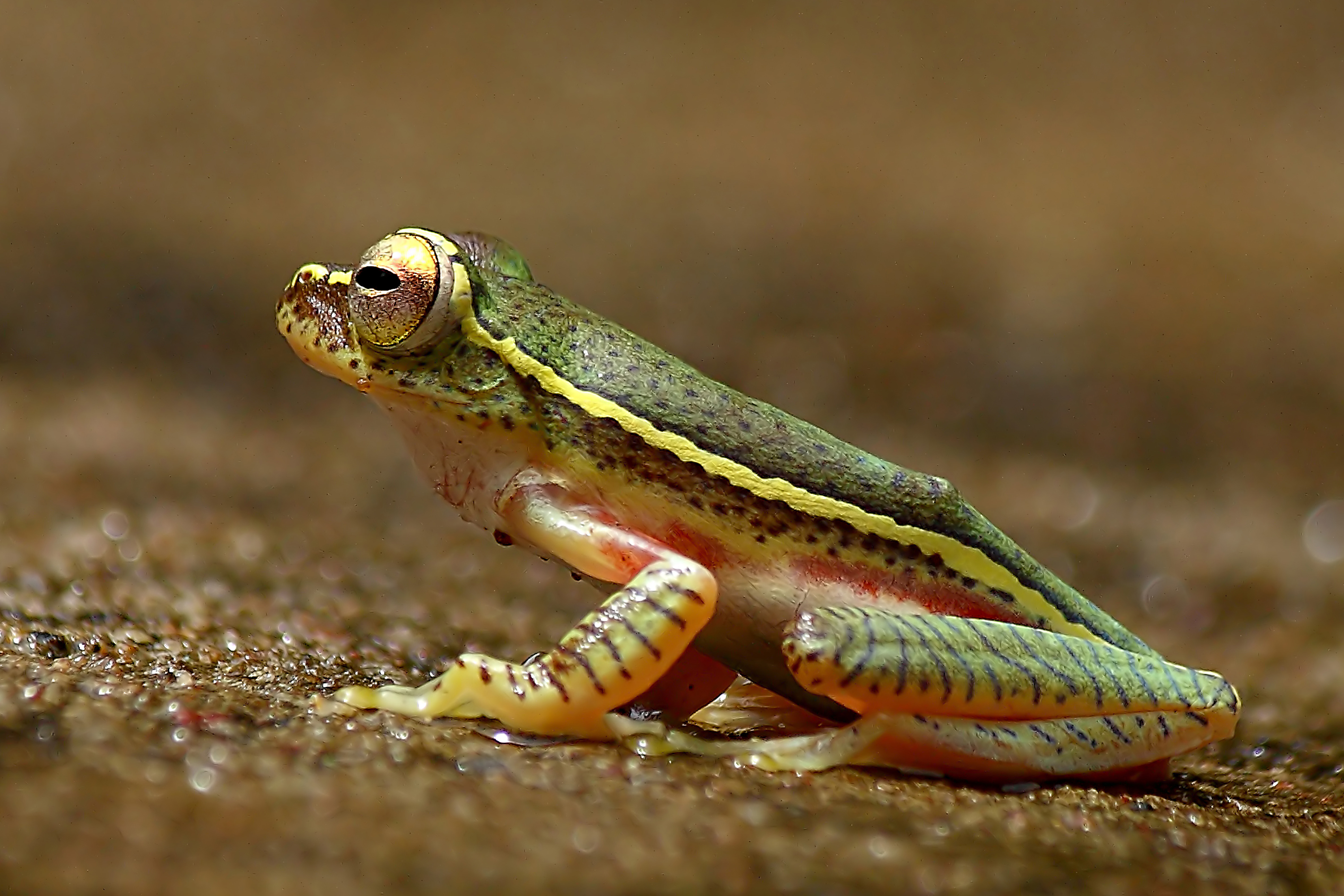
Lateral view (male)

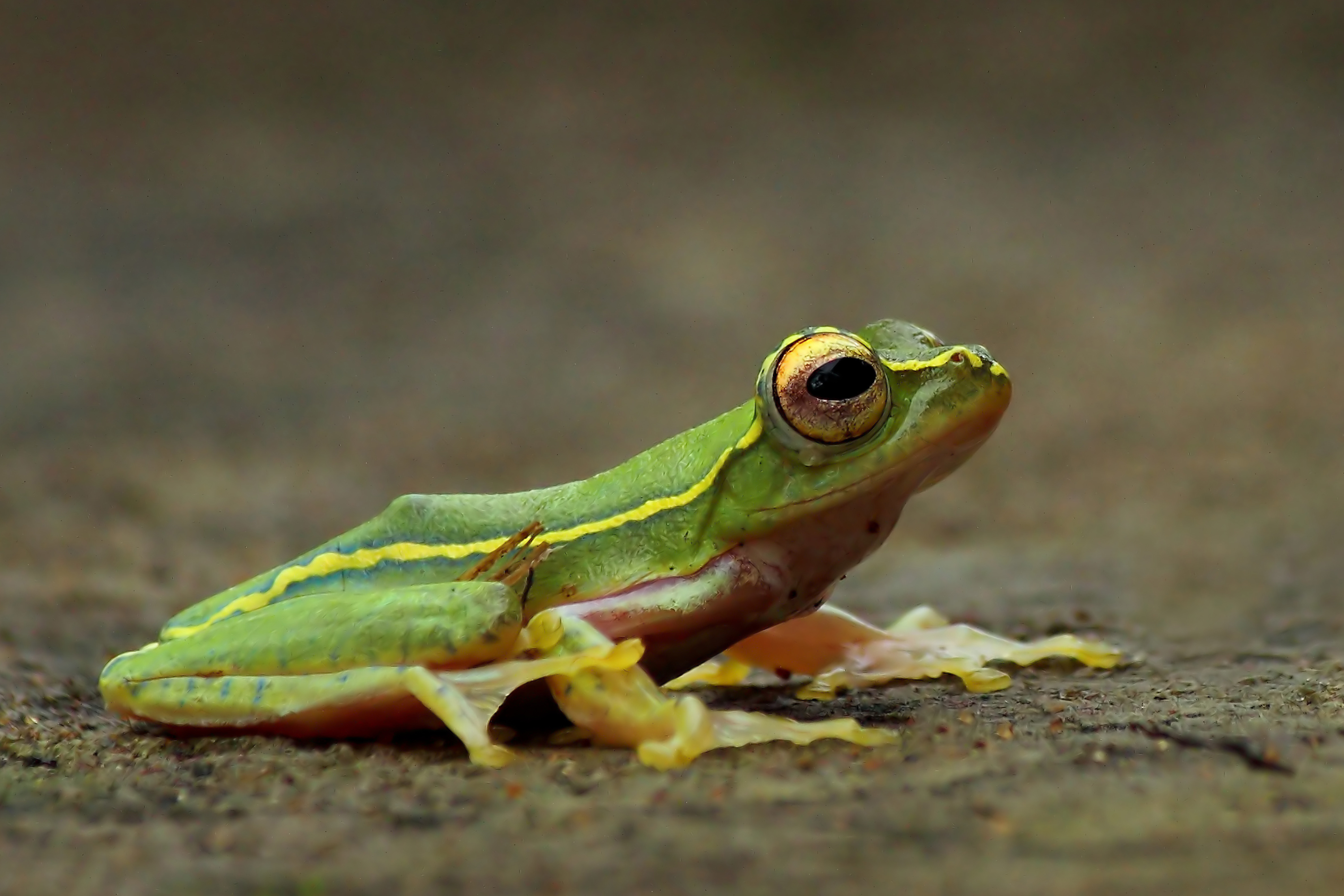
Lateral view (female)

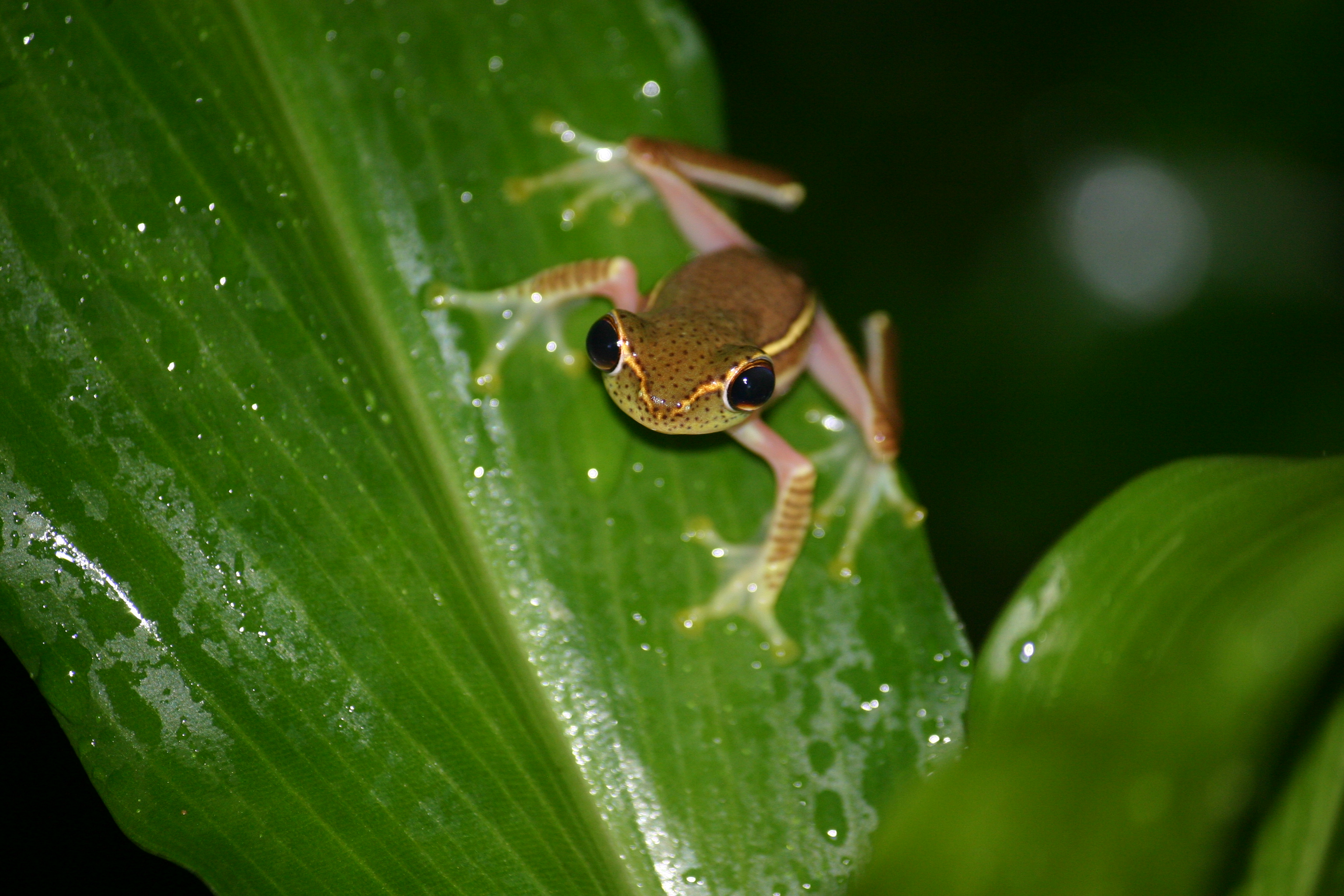
Front view

===== Rhacophorus malabaricus (Malabar gliding frog) =====
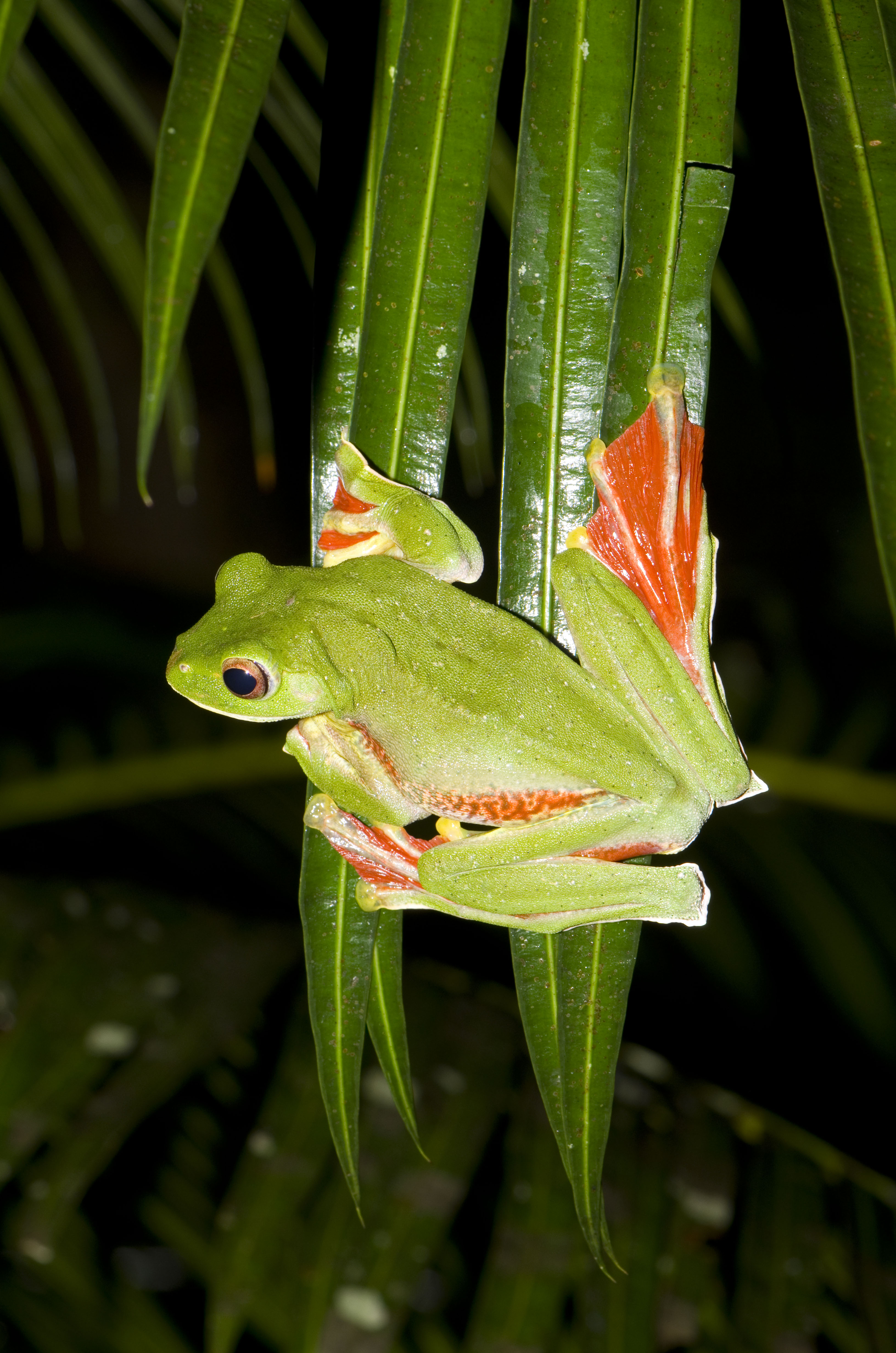
Dorsal view

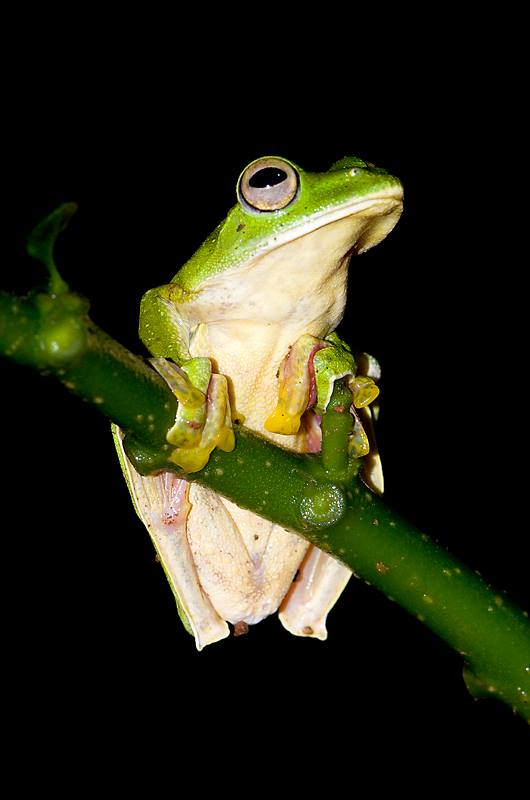
Ventral view

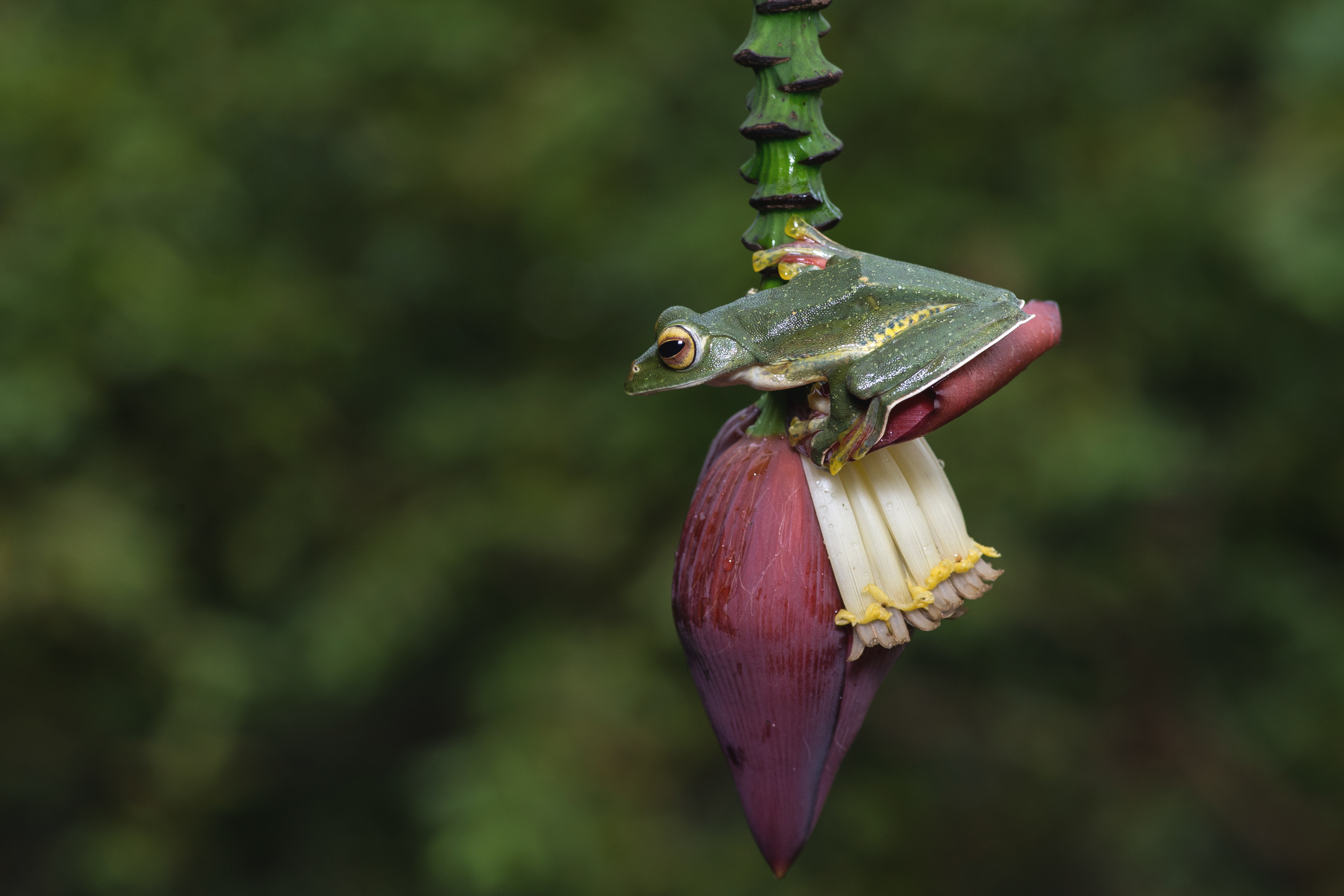
Lateral view

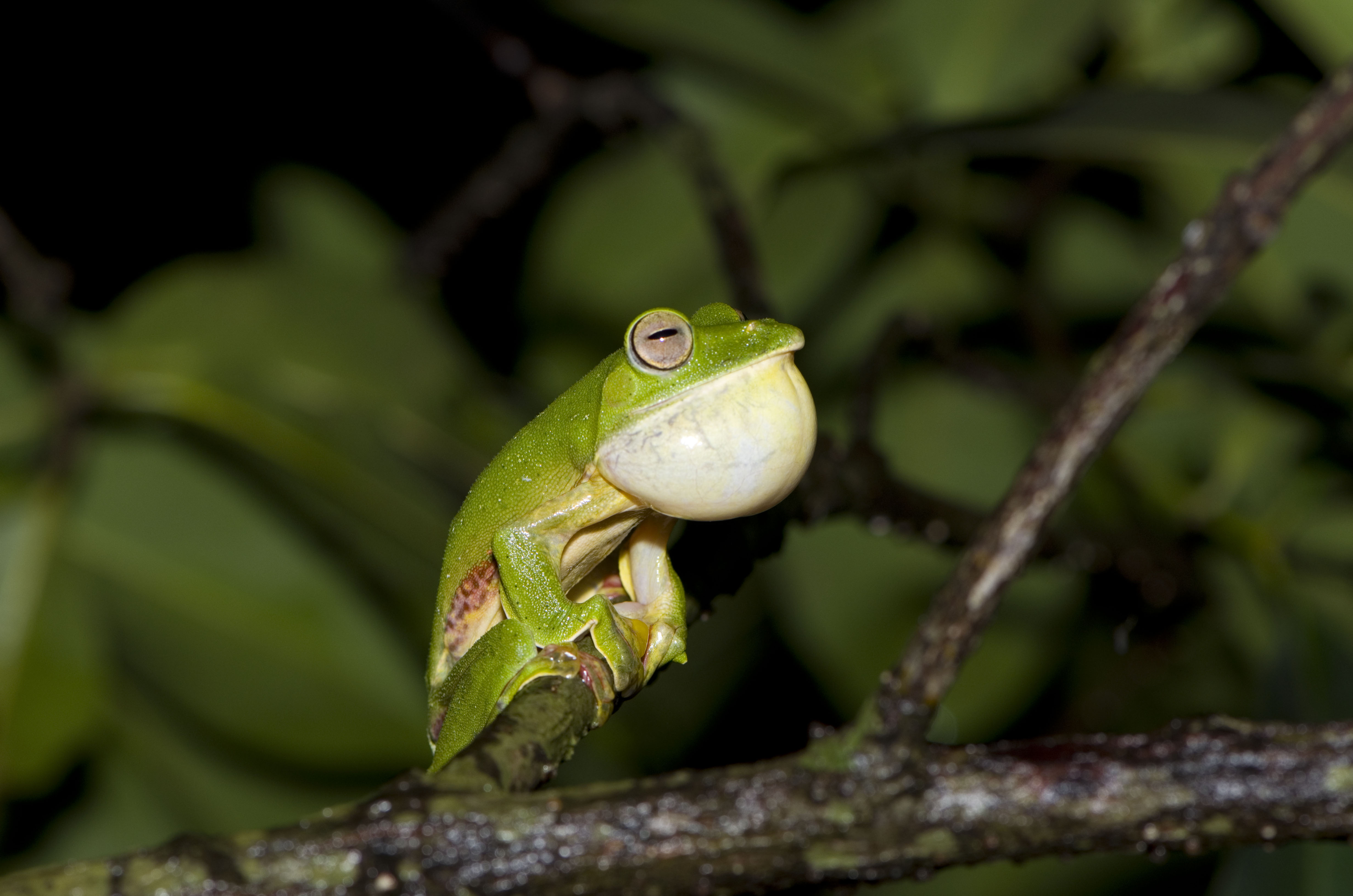
Calling

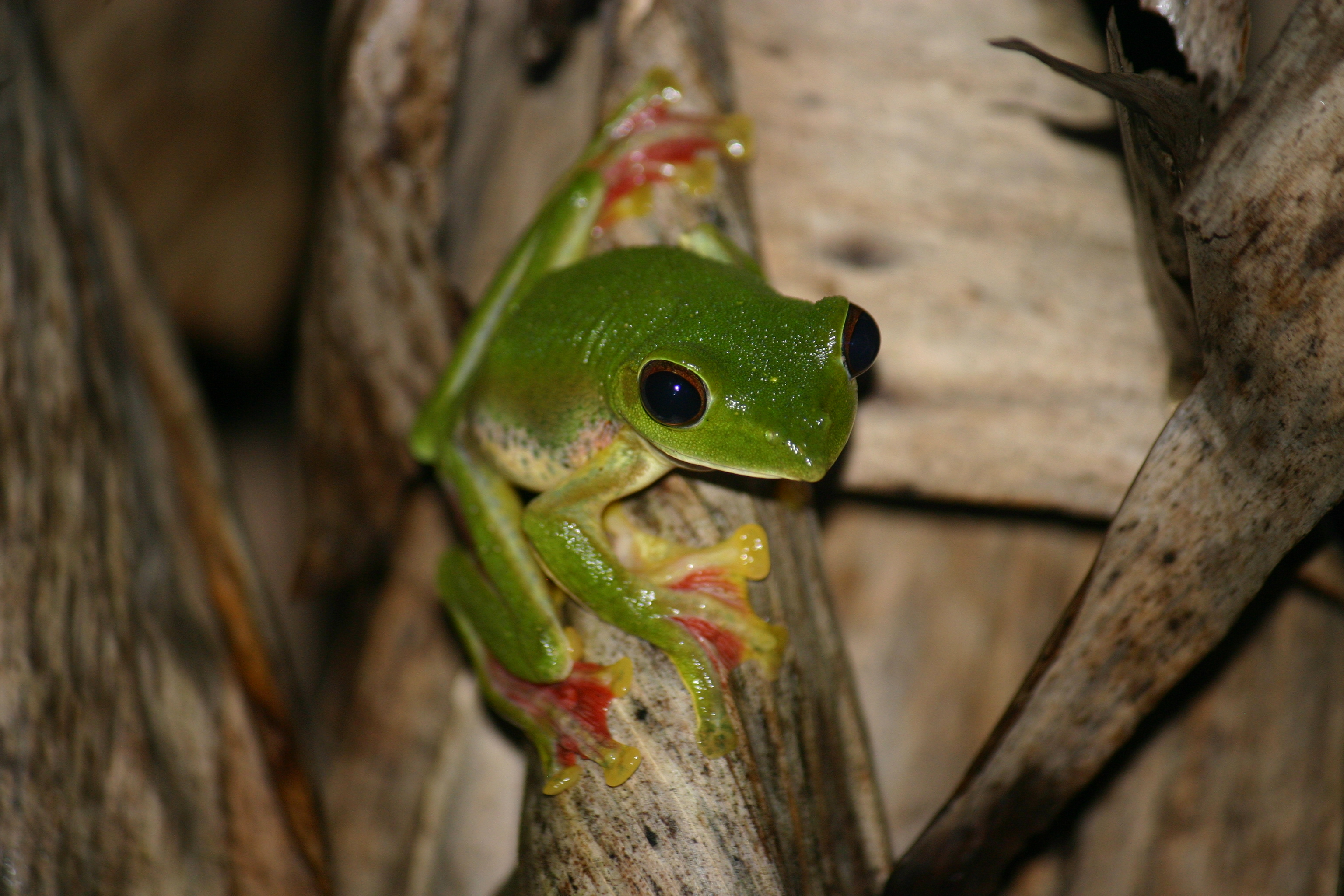
Front view

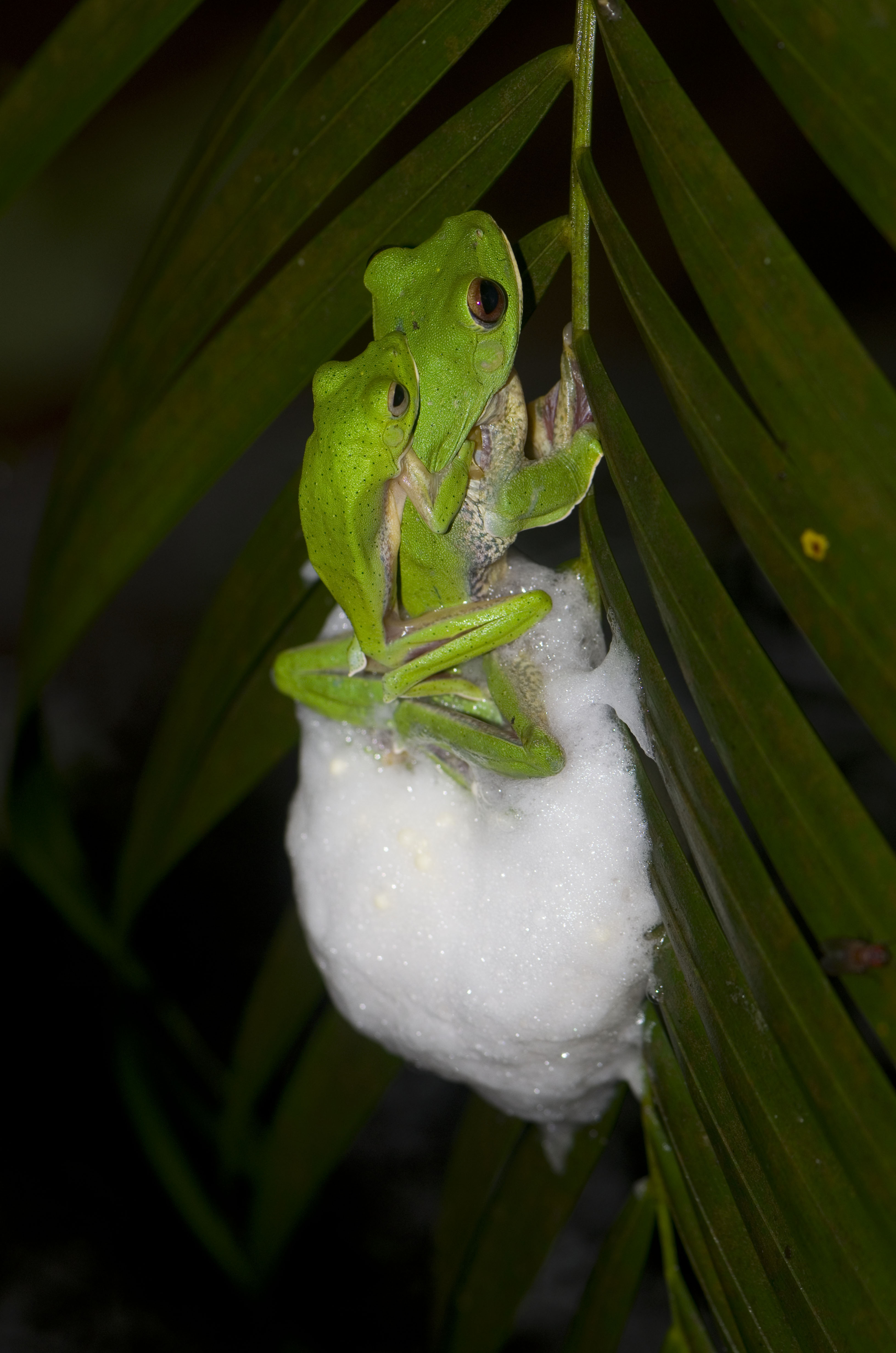
Mating

===== Rhacophorus pseudomalabaricus (false Malabar gliding frog) =====
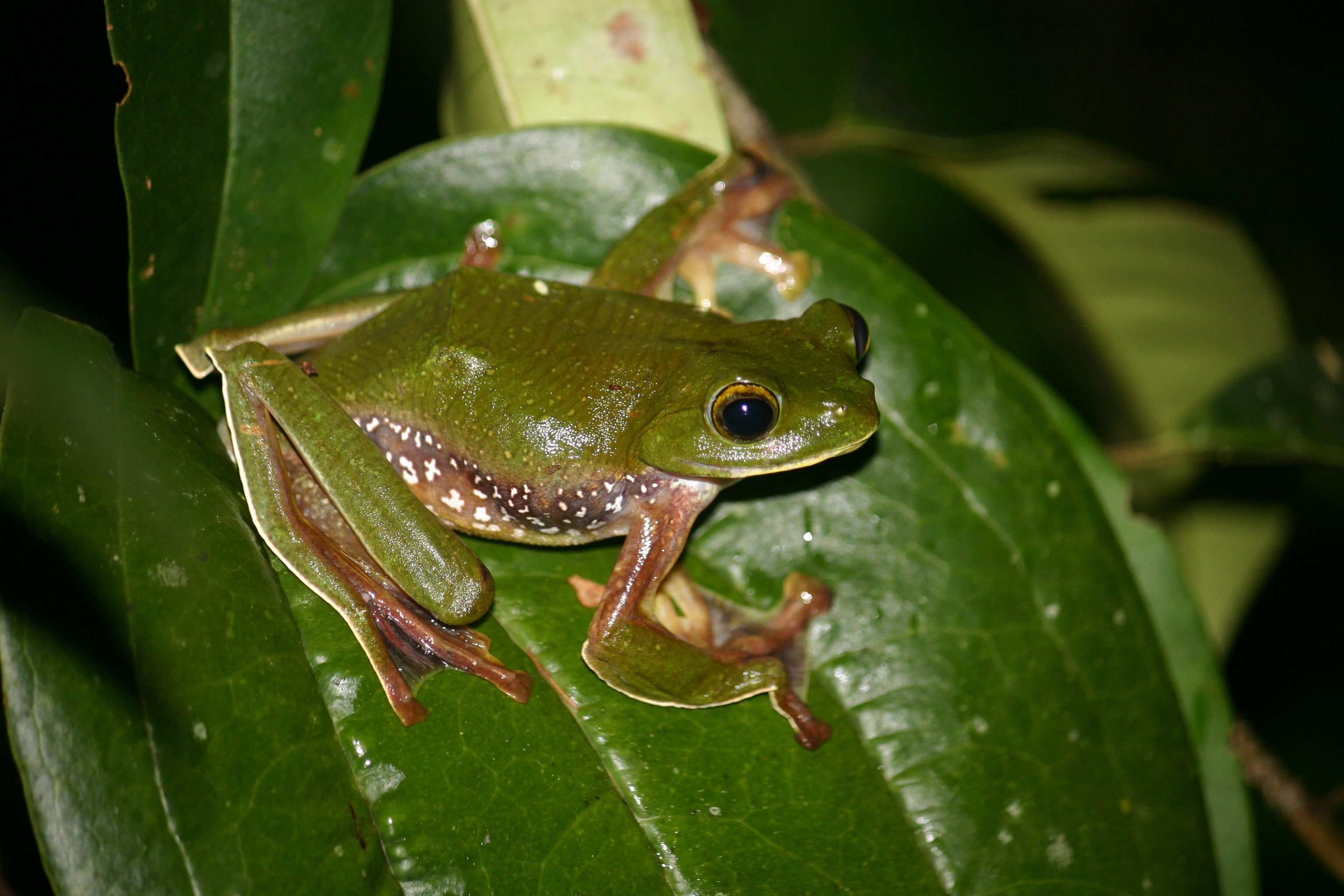
Dorsal view

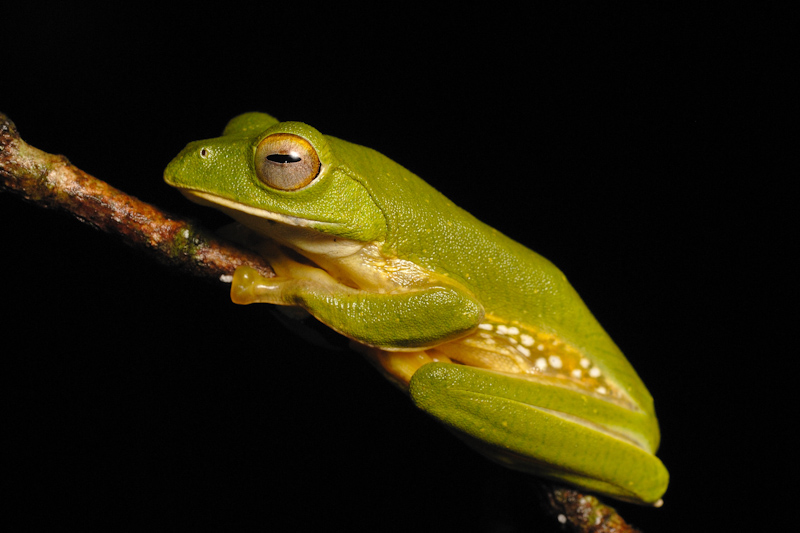
Lateral view

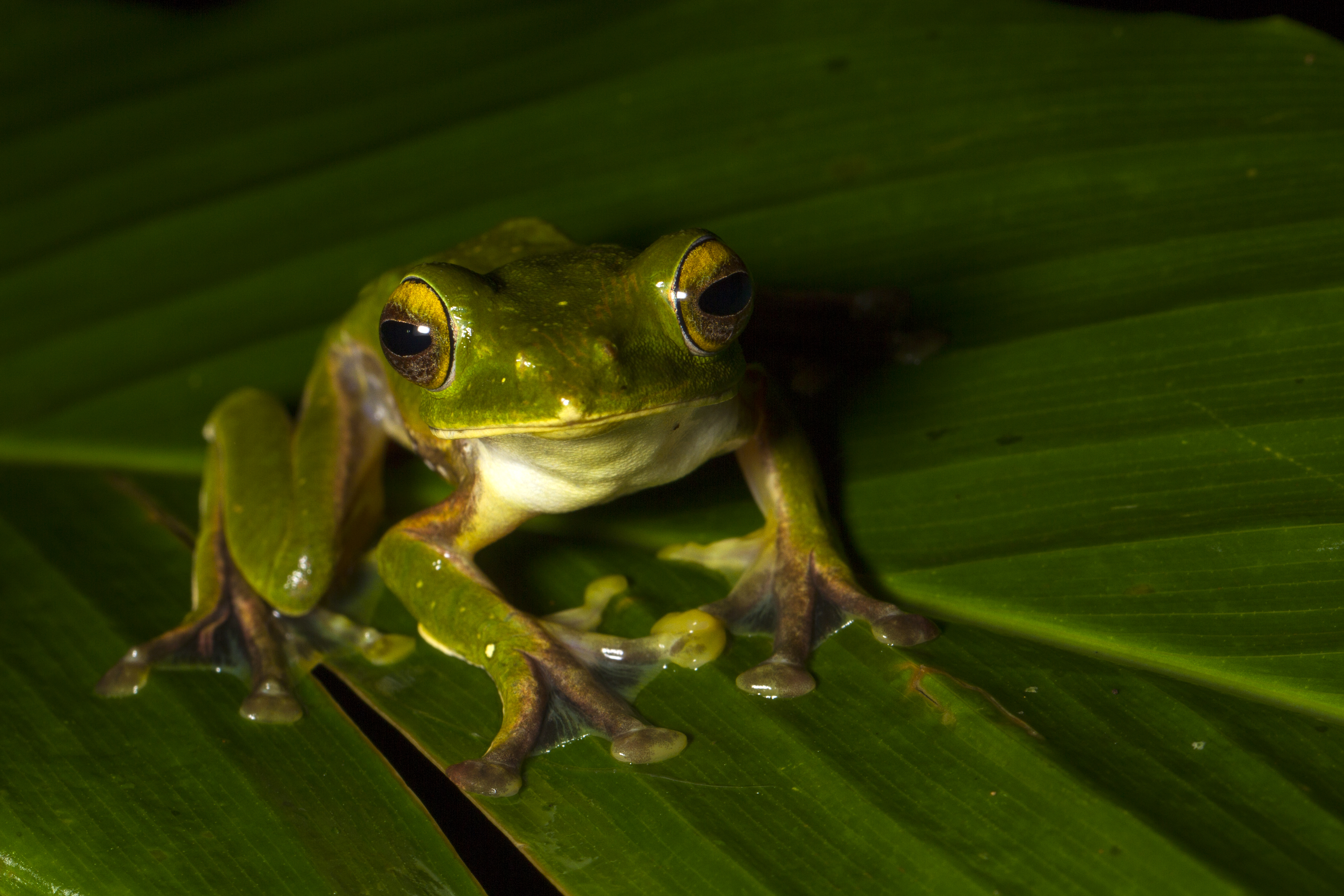
Front view

== Order: Gymnophiona (Caecilians) ==
=== Family: Ichthyophiidae (Asiatic tailed caecilians) ===
==== Genus: Ichthyophis ====
===== Ichthyophis beddomei (yellow-striped caecilian) =====
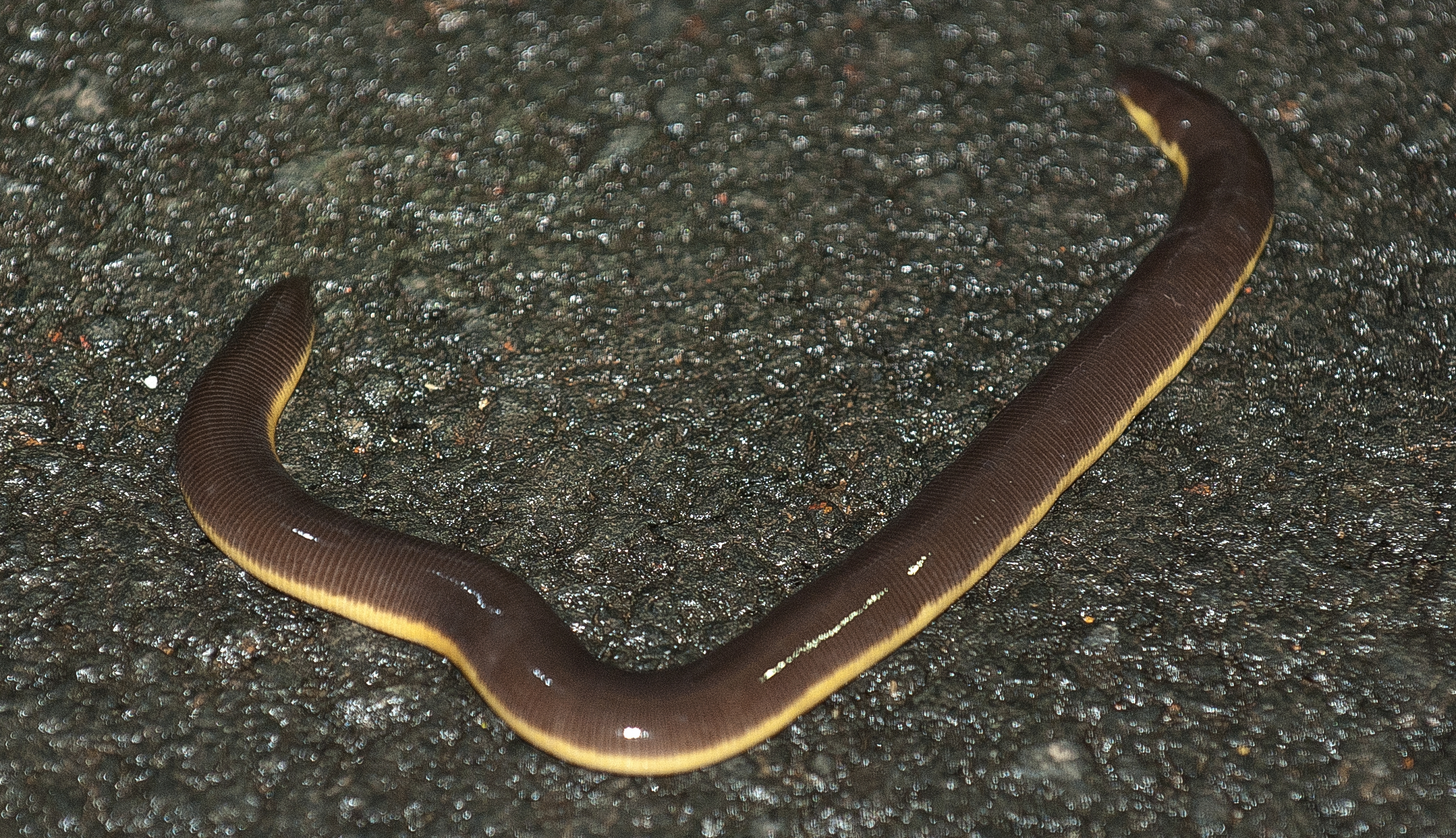

===== Ichthyophis bombayensis (Bombay caecilian) =====
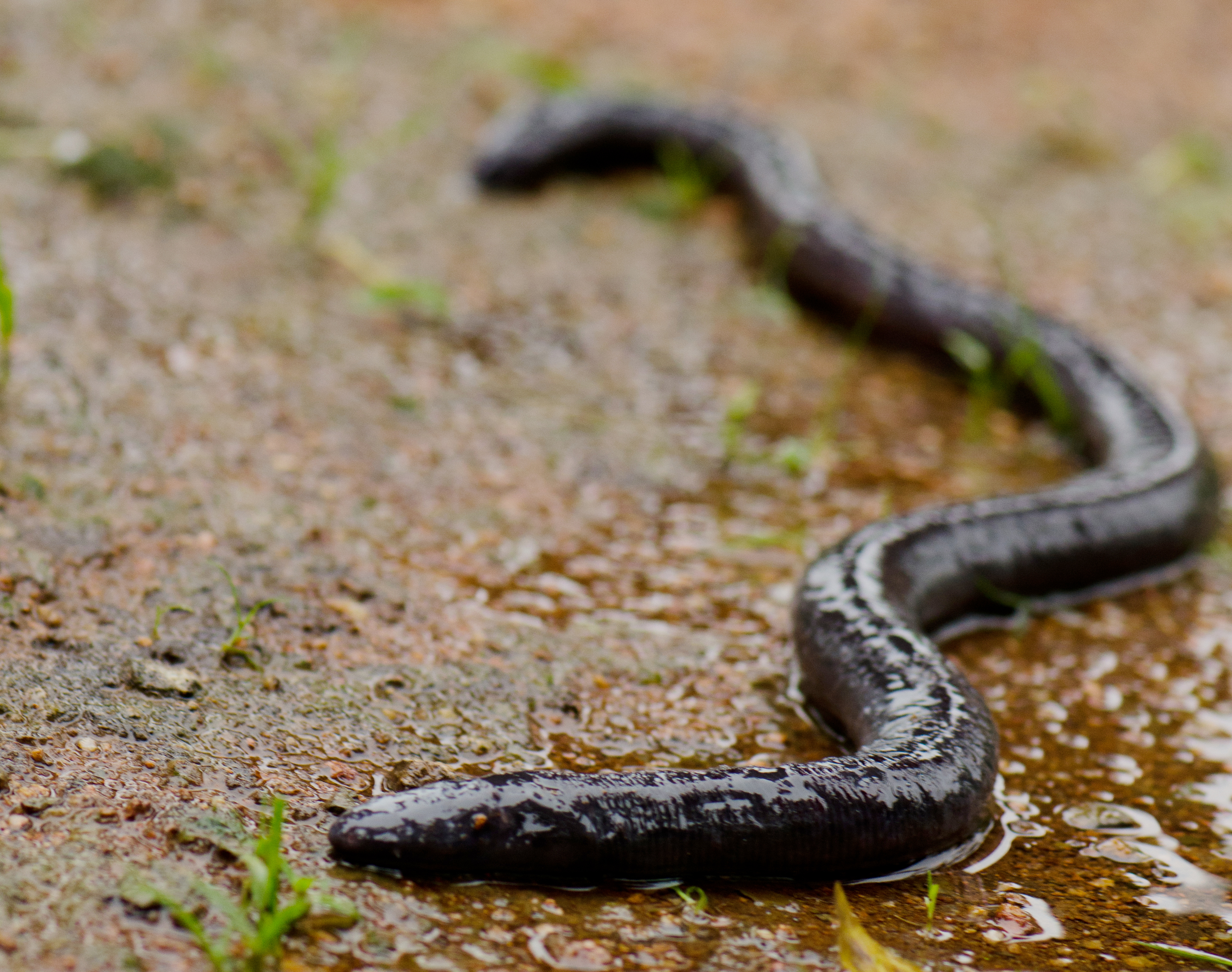

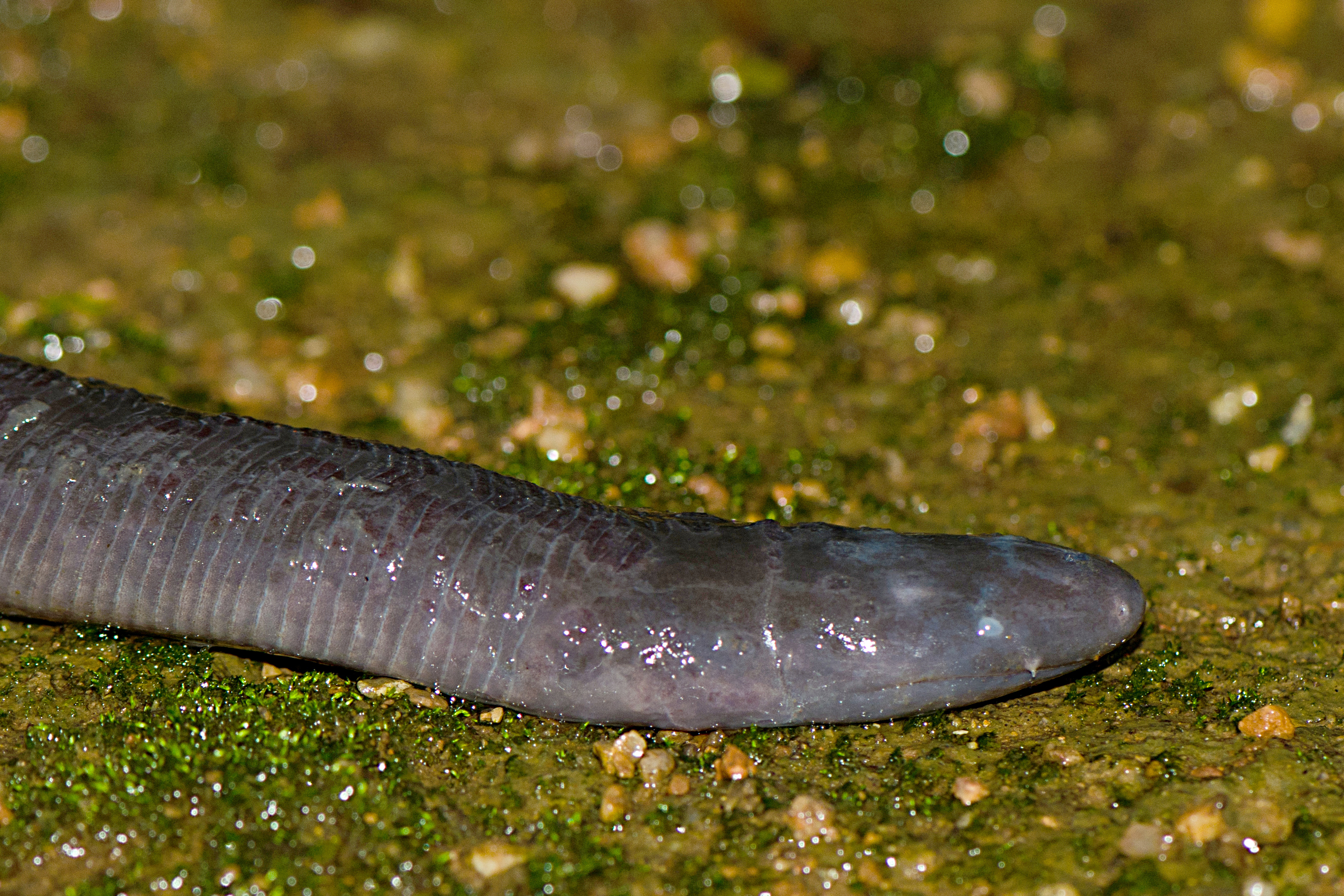
Head

===== Ichthyophis longicephalus (long-headed caecilian) =====
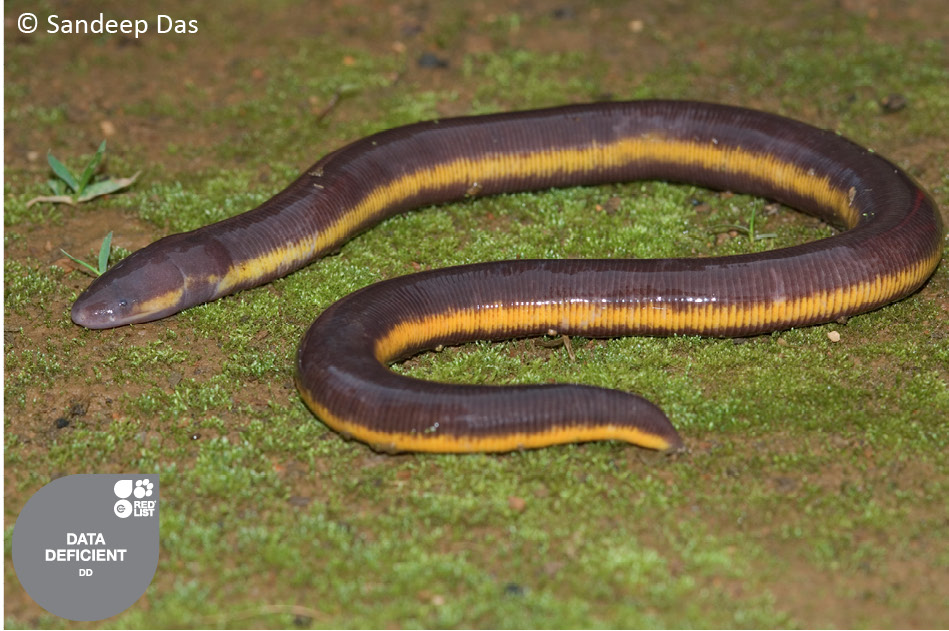

==== Genus: Uraeotyphlus ====
===== Uraeotyphlus interruptus (Chengalam caecilian) =====
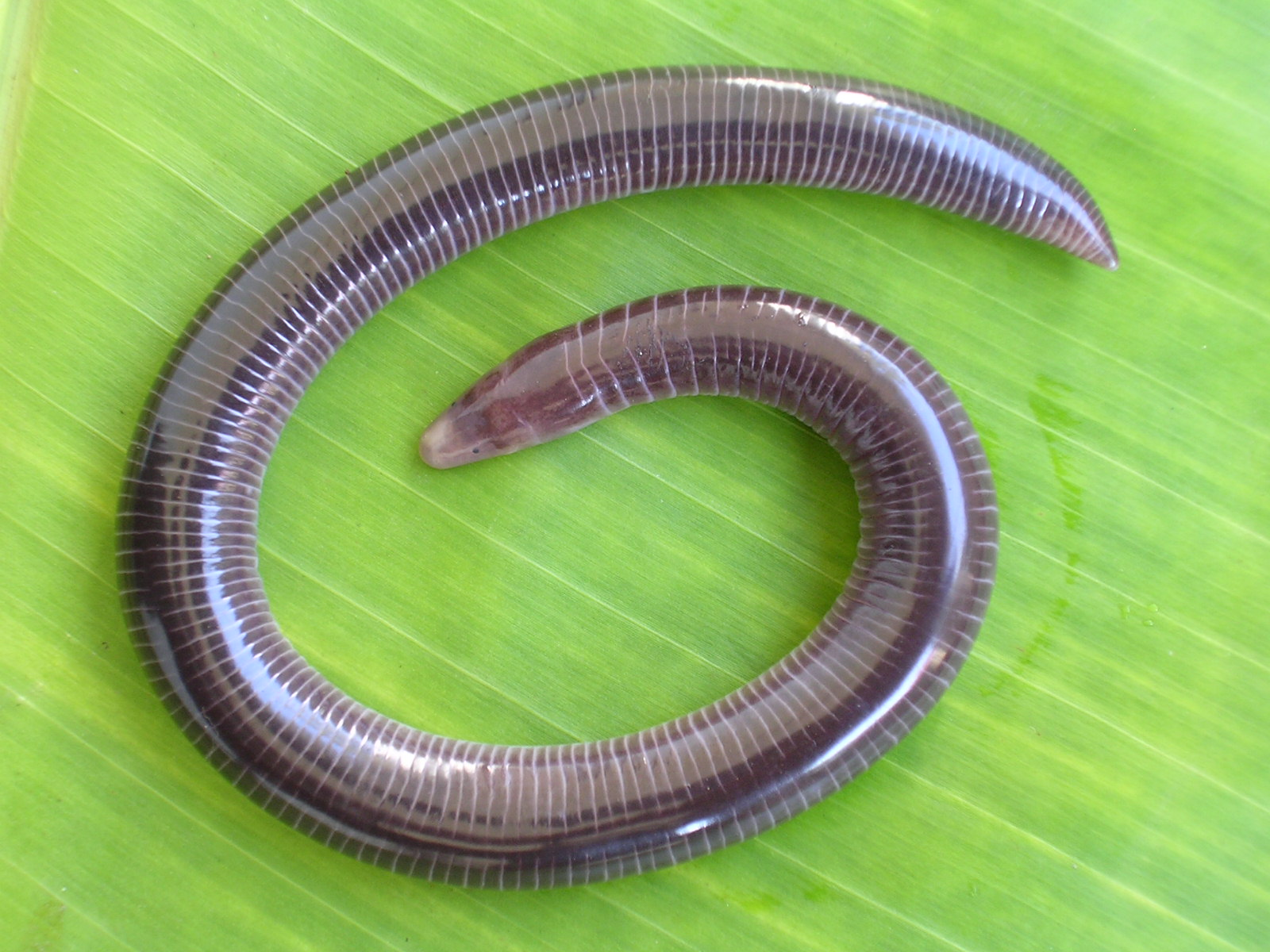

===== Uraeotyphlus menoni (Kerala caecilian, Menon's caecilian) =====
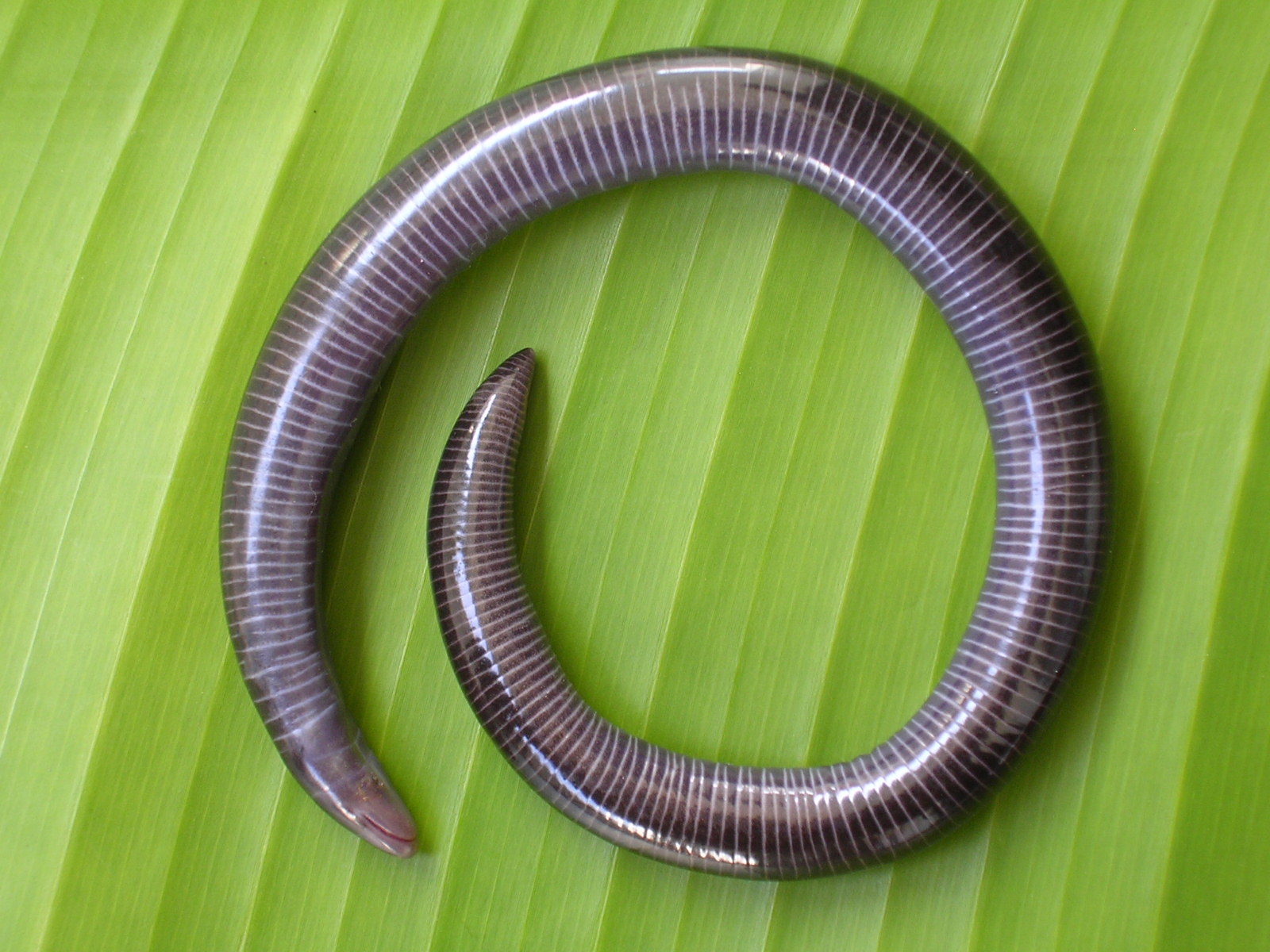

===== Uraeotyphlus narayani (Narayan's caecilian) =====
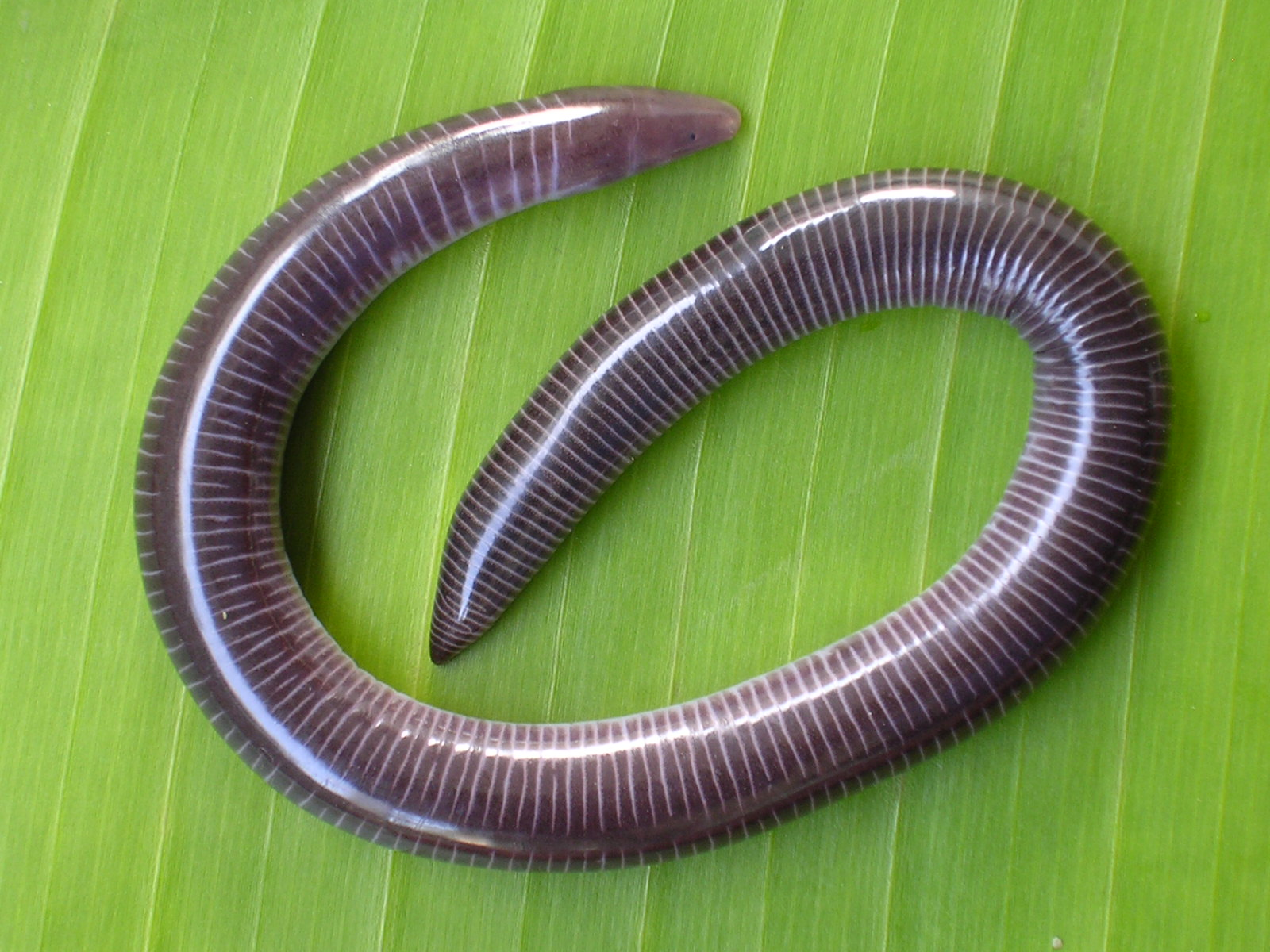

===== Uraeotyphlus oxyurus (red caecilian) =====
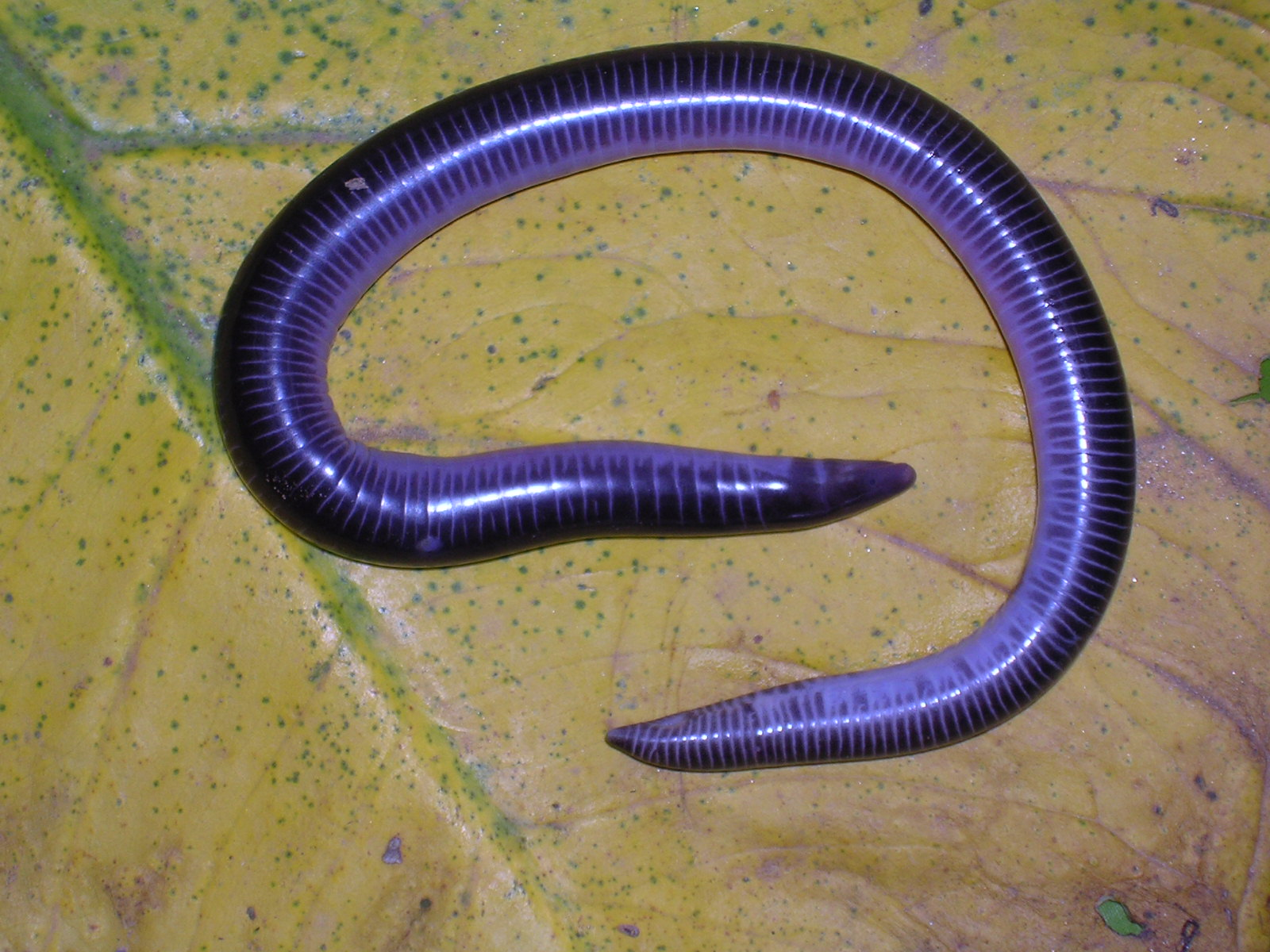
