= Drawings by Douglas Hamilton =

There are at least two hundred and twelve detailed drawings by Douglas Hamilton of South Indian landscapes, game animals and forestry operations. Eighty seven of Hamilton's careful drawings of the Annaimalai Hills, Palani Hills and Shevaroy Hills are in the British Library, ninety six drawings were published in his autobiography, Records of Sport in Southern India... and an additional thirty one were published in Forests and Gardens of South India.

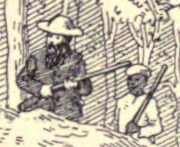
Douglas Hamilton, self-portrait...107

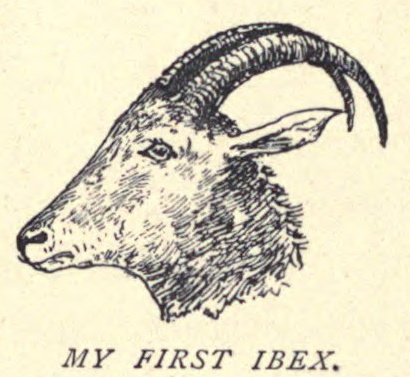
His first ibex

Douglas Hamilton signature, c. 1891

Lieutenant-Colonel Douglas Hamilton (1818 – 1892) was a British Indian Army officer, gazetted to the 21st Regiment of the Madras Native Infantry from 1837 to 1871. Hamilton was a well known forester, surveyor and illustrator of the early British hill stations in South India and a famous sportsman, shikari, big-game hunter and trophy collector. He was an acute observer of nature and a gentleman.

Though executed only in pen and ink or pencil, these drawings have artistic merit due to the artist's skillful use of hatching and stippling to achieve realistic texture, shading and perspective. Hamilton's illustration of subjects and backgrounds that are unfamiliar to most people, creates initial interest in his drawings. His effective portrayal of actual or implied recent or future dramatic action heightens the viewer's interest in his subjects. Hamilton selected from his sketches those that best illustrate scenes in his writing. This implies there were also additional drawings, however their existence is now unknown.

== Government drawings ==
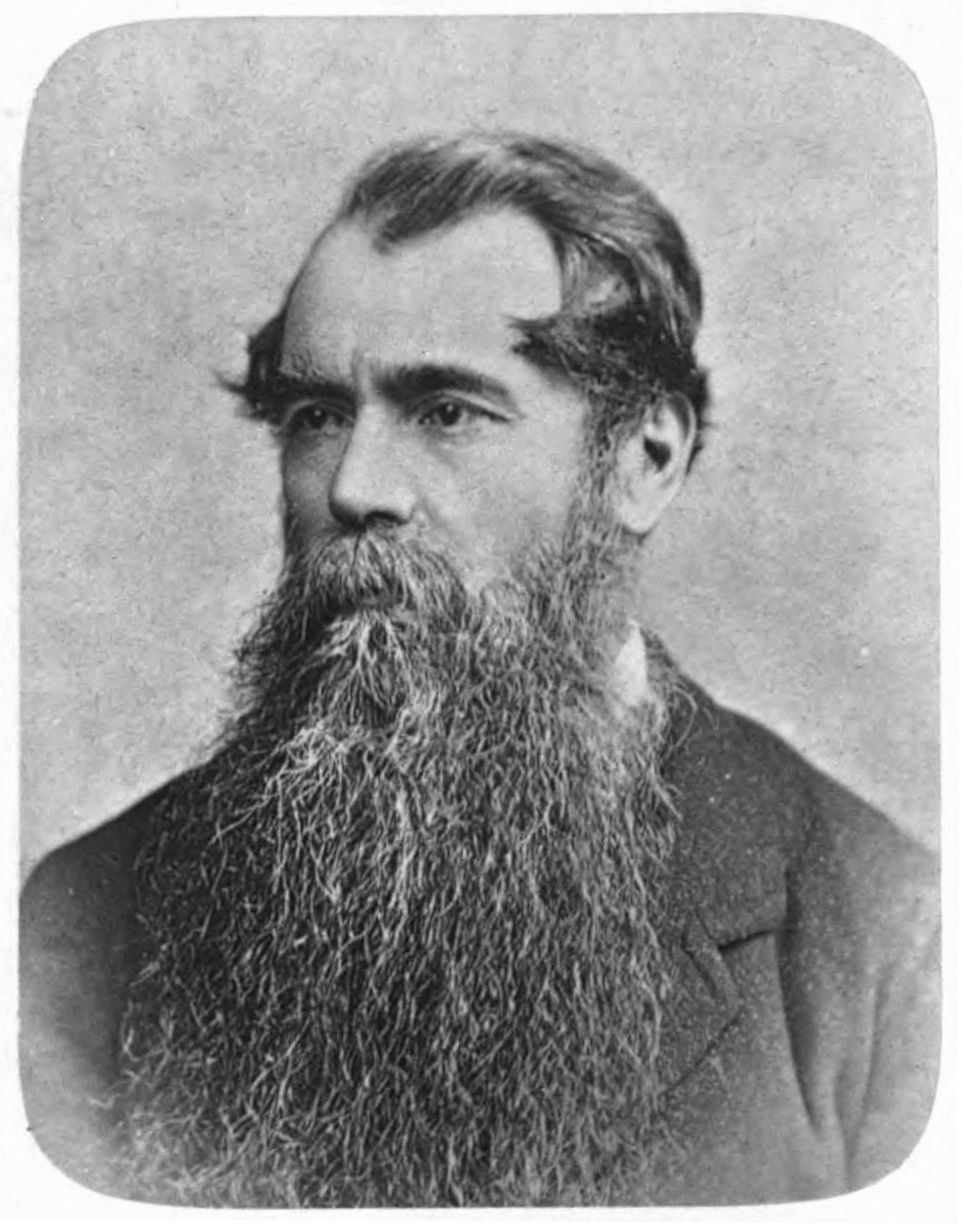
Douglas Hamilton, 1870, age 52

In 1862 Colonel Hamilton was relieved of routine regimental Army duties and given a roving commission by Sir Charles Trevelyan, the Finance Minister of India and former Governor of Madras Presidency, to conduct surveys and make drawings for the Government of all the hill plateaus in Southern India that might suit as Sanitaria, or quarters for European troops. Thereafter, Douglas Hamilton was on "special duty" with the 44th Regiment, Madras Native Infantry.

A series of five albums of careful drawings of the Annaimalai Hills, Palani Hills and Shevaroy Hills was the result of this commission. While at work on this commission he had great opportunities to follow his favorite pursuit of big game hunting, and also to observe the habits of the various animals inhabiting the different districts. These well-known drawings showed him as an accurate observer and a careful draughtsman. Each series of drawings was accompanied by a Survey article describing all aspects of the district. Some of his publications about these surveys include:

Lt.-Col. Douglas Hamilton, Report on the Shevaroy Hills (Madras, 1862),
Lt.-Col. Douglas Hamilton, Report on the Pulni Mountains (Madras, 1864)
Lt.-Col. Douglas Hamilton, Report on the High Ranges of the Annamullay Mountains (Madras, 1866)

=== Albums at British Library ===
The India Office Records in the Asian and African Print Room at the British Library has five albums of Hamilton's work that include eighty six drawings. These albums are:

12 Drawings in the Shevaroy Hills -

WD1351, Hamilton, Douglas (1818-1892) is an album of 12 pen and ink drawings of landscapes in the Shevaroy Hills made in 1861. The 24 folio volume is entitled: Sketches of the Shevaroy Hills by Lieut-Col. Douglas Hamilton, Madras army. 1861. Printed descriptions are attached to each picture. Size of the volume is 22.5 by 31.75 inches. It was deposited in the British Library on 4 June 1866. These drawings are:

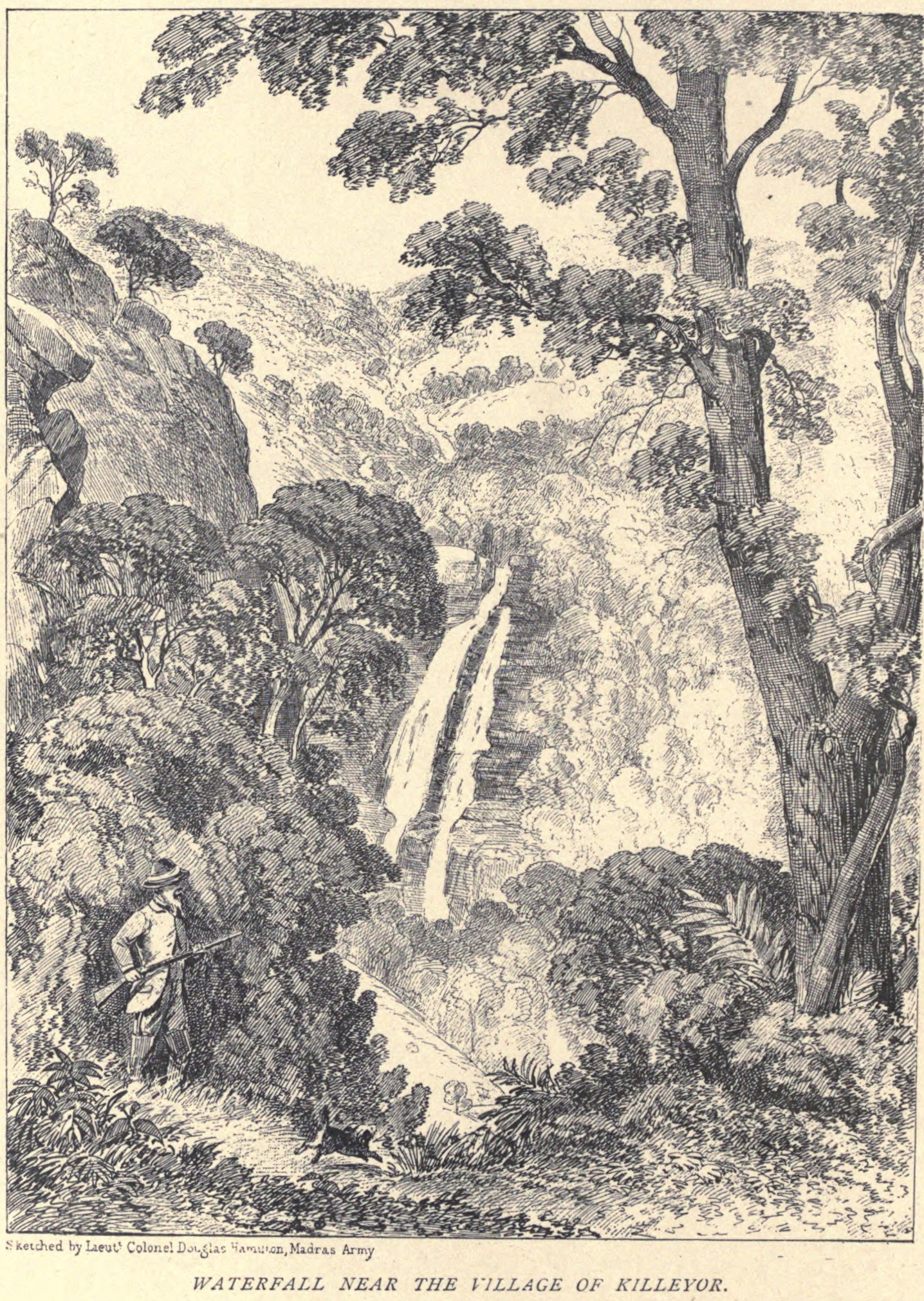
Waterfall Near the Village of Killayur...viii

1. f.2 '1.(*) Waterfall near the village of Killeyor. An Englishman in the foreground.
2. f.4 '2. Panoramic view from the Garden of Dr Marrett's House at Yercaud. An Englishman, his wife and child in the foreground.
3. f.6' 3. View of the Temple on the Shevaroyen.
4. f.8 '4. Panoramic view of Yercaud from the summit of the Shevaroyen.
5. f.10 '5.(*) The lake at Yercaud.
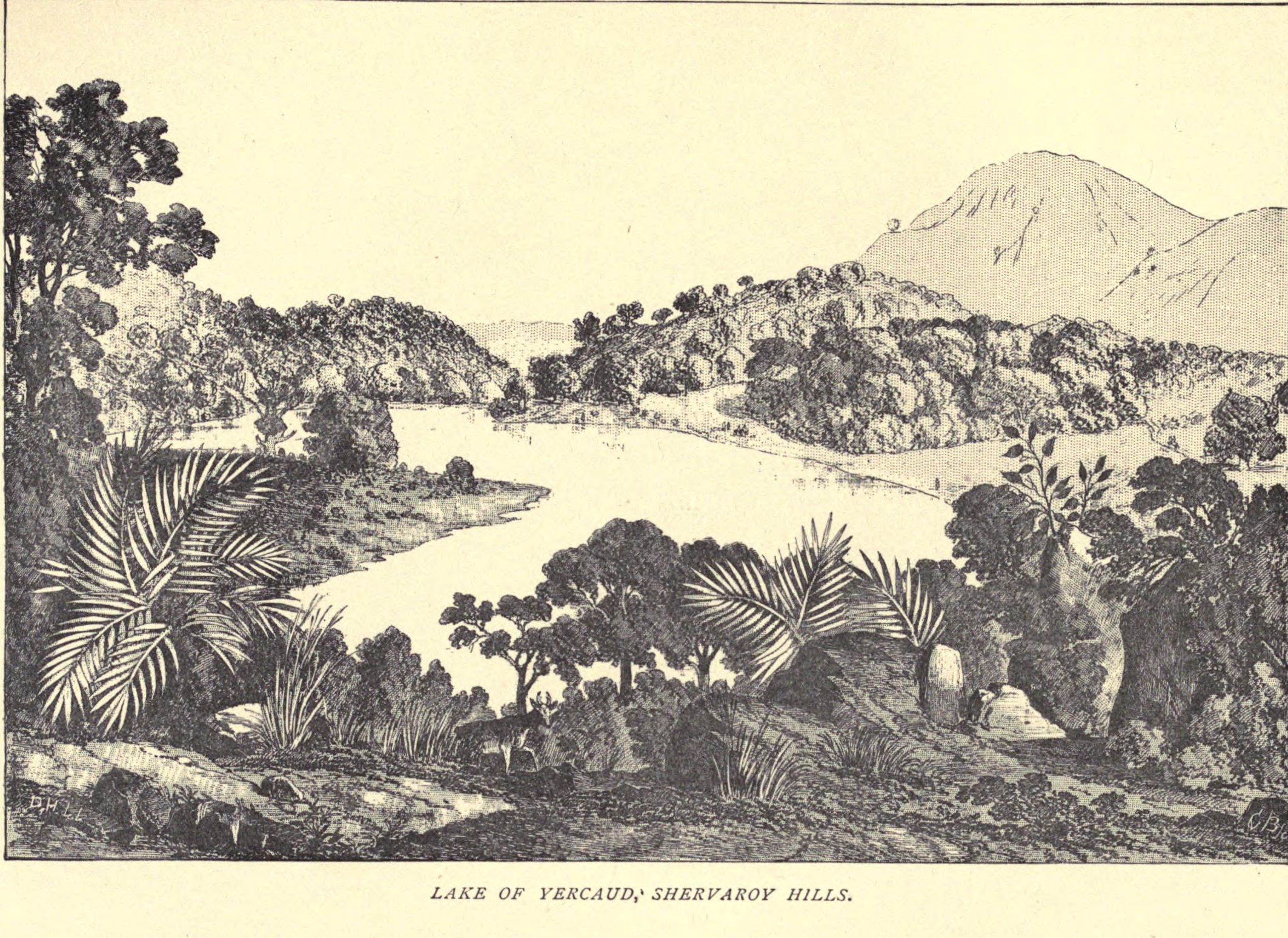
  Lake of Yercaud, Shervaroy Hills...xix
6. f.12 '6. Panoramic view of Yercaud and the Green Hills, taken from Fischer's Hill. Two Englishmen in the foreground.
7. f.14 '7. Hill temples.
8. f.16 '8. Panorama of the plateau of the Green Hills.
9. f.18 '9. View of the plateau of the Green Hills.
10. f.20 '10. View of a Malayaly village and cultivation. An Englishman in the foreground.
11. f.22 '11. View of a Malayaly village.
12. f.24 '12. Panoramic view of the Athoor Ghaut from the summit of the Shevaroyen. Two Englishmen with servants and horses in the foreground.
(*): also published in Records of Sport in Southern India...

26 Drawings in the Palni Hills -

WD566, Hamilton, Douglas (1818-1892) is an album of 26 pen and ink drawings of views in the Palni Hills. This 60 folio volume of views in the Palni Hills was made in 1862, with printed titles and descriptions and some drawings inscribed with titles in pencil. Size of the volume is 20 by 25 inches. It was deposited c. 1866. These drawings are:

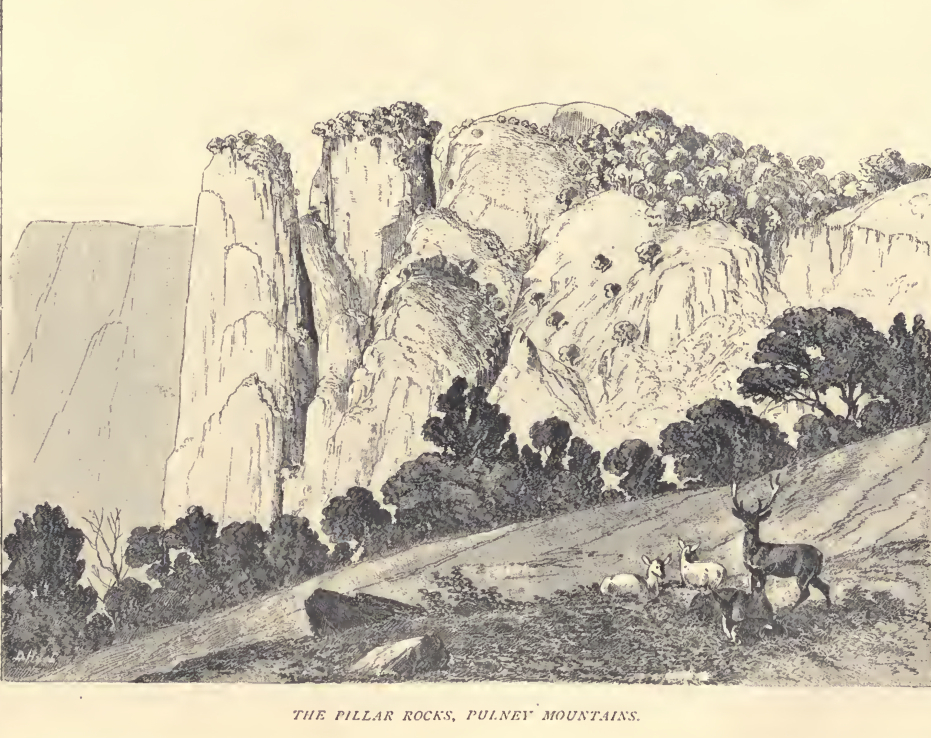
View of the Pillar Rocks in Kodaikanal, Tamil Nadu, India

1. f.3 '1. View of the Entrance to the Hill Village of Pullangee.
2. f.5 '2. Distant view of Pulni Mountains.
3. f.7 '3. View of the higher Pulnis.
4. f.9 '4. View in the Perreakolum Pass.
5. f.11 5. Another view of the Periyakulam Pass. Hamilton and his horse in the foreground.
6. f.13 '6. View in the valley of Perrumbookarnal. Hamilton and his gun-bearer in the foreground stalking ibex. Reproduced: 'Records of sport,' plate xv.
7. f.15 '7. View of the Settlement of Kudaikarnal.
8. f.17 '8. Distant View of Kudaikarnal.
9. f.21 '9. Panorama of the Plateau in the Neighbourhood of Kudaikarnal. Pillar Rocks and Hamilton with servant and dog pursuing a stag.
10. f.23 '10.(*) View of the Pillar Rocks.
11. f.25 '11. View of the great cave at the Pillar Rocks.
12. f.27 '12. View to the South West beyond the Pillar Rocks. Deer.
13. f.29 '13. View of the Gundair and Pombarry valleys. A herd of bison in the foreground.
14. f.31 '14. View of Vilputty, 3 miles N.E. of Kodalkanal.
15. f.35 '15. Panorama of 'the Plateau of Poortoor'.
16. f.37 '16. View of Pullangee.
17. f.43 '18. View of the Entrance to the Village of Pombarry.
18. f.45 '19. A Street in the hill village of Pombarry.
19. f.47 '20. View of 'the Pombarry Valley.
20. f.49 '21. Wooded Valley between Kodaikarnal and Pombarry. Deer in the foreground.
21. f.51 '22. Distant View of Kokul. A villager grazing cows in the foreground.
22. f.53 '23. View of Kokul Village.
23. f.55 '24. Distant View of the Hills near Ettoor or the Eight Villages. Hamilton with his sketch-book, camp chair and two attendants.
24. f.57 '25. View of the entrance to the village of Mannavanur.
25. f.59 '26. View of Perumal Mullay and the lower Pulnis. Hamilton looking through his field-glasses; a gun-bearer and dead deer in the foreground.

17 Drawings in the Palni Hills -

WD1350, Hamilton, Douglas (1818-1892); is an album of 17 pen and ink drawings of landscapes in the Palni Hills, 1862 (35 folios), Volume entitled: Sketches of the Pulni Mountains. Printed descriptions are attached to each picture and there are pencil descriptions on the sketches. Size of the volume is 22.5 by 31.75 inches, deposited c. 1866. These drawings are:

1. f.2 Frontispiece. The Devil's Gap. Bodinalkenur Pass.
2. f.5' 1. Panorama of the High Range of the Pulnis from the summit of the Perumal mullay.
3. f.7 '2. View from the high ground west of the settlement of Kudaikarnal.
4. f.9 '3. View of Perumal Mullay from the encampment.
5. f.11 '4. Panorama overlooking the 'Cumbum Valley'.
6. f.13 '5. The Pillar Rocks.
7. .15 '6. Bird's Eye view of the ancient lake near Kodaikanal.
8. f.17 '7. View of the ancient lake from near the breach in the embankment. Near Kodaikanal.
9. f.19 '8. The breached embankment.
10. f.21 '9. View of the boundary ridge dividing the Pulnis' 'from Travancore. Englishmen shooting bison in foreground.
11. f.23 '10. Village on the lower Pulnis.
12. f.25 '11. View near Perryoor on the lower Pulnis.
13. f.27 '12. View of the lower Pulnis.
14. f.29 '13. View of the entrance to the village of Perryoor.
15. f.31 '14. View on the lower Pulnis.
16. f.33 '15. The Pulnis from the village of Pulni. Villagers in the foreground.
17. f.35 Vignette. Mountain antelope and Ponjola Hill.

17 Drawings in the Anaimalai Hills -

WD567, Hamilton, Douglas (1818-1892) is an album of 17 pen and ink drawings of views in the Anaimalai Hills (Cochin and Madras) 1863. European school / British school, (30 folios) 1863, with printed titles and descriptions. All signed: 'D. Hamilton delt.' Size of the volume is 20.75 by 14.5 inches. It was deposited c. 1866. These drawings are:

1. ff.2-4 '1. Panorama of the Anamallay Mountains from the village of Anamallay. Khaders in the foreground.
2. f.5 '2. The Foot of the Poonachy Pass.
3. f.5 '3. Encampment at Poonachy.
4. f.7 '4. Lower valley of the Tooracoodoo.
5. f.9 '5. Our first view of the 'Tungachee'. An Englishman in the foreground.
6. f.11 '6. The 'Tungachee' and 'Ukka'.
7. f.13 '7. Khader Rattan Chain for collecting honey.
8. f.15 '8. Waterfall at foot of the 'Tungachee'.
9. f.17 '9. Ancient Cromlech. Lower valley of the Tooracoodoo.
10. f.18 '10. Primitive bridge of the Khaders. An English party in the foreground.
11. f.19 '11. Haystack rock. Rattan Chain.
12. f.21 '12. The 'Tungachee' from our encampment.
13. ff.23,24 '13. High range from our Encampment. Villagers and elephants in the foreground.
14. f.26 '14. View in Michael's Valley.
15. f.28 '15. Water-fall in Michael's Valley.
16. f, 16. Gorge of the Tooracoodoo.
17. f.29 '17. High range from the lower valley of the Tooracoodoo. Englishmen and elephants in the foreground.

15 Drawings in the Anaimalai Hills -

WD568, Hamilton, Douglas (1818-1892); is an album of 15 pen and ink drawings (33 folios) of views in the Anaimalai Hills (Cochin and Madras). 1863, with printed titles and descriptions. (Inscribed on fly leaf: 'India Museum, received from public deposit on 4 June 1866'). Size of the volume is 22 by 28.5 inches. These drawings are:

1. 2 Frontispiece. Cascade in Michael's Valley. Dogs pursuing a stag.
2. f.5 '1. Outline panorama of Michael's Valley looking west. Hamilton and an attendant stalking ibex.
3. f.7 '2. Bird's eye view of Michael's Valley looking west. Taken from the hill, Parli Mulai.
4. f.10 '3. Panoramic view of Michael's Valley looking east. Ibex in foreground.
5. f.12 '4. View of the Upper or Western portion of the large swamp in Michael's Valley. Bison in foreground.
6. f.14 '5. View of the lower portion of the large swamp in Michael's Valley. Elephants and sambur.
7. f.16 '6. Water-fall below Michael's Valley. Ibex.
8. f.18 '7. View of the Eastern Plateaux referred to in sketch No. 3. Ibex in foreground.
9. f.20 '8. View of Coomarikul Plateau. Ibex and bison.
10. f.22 '9. Encampment at the lower end of Michael's Valley. Hamilton returning from shikar with two attendants
11. f.24 '10. View between Michael's Valley and Coomarikul Plateau. Bison grazing
12. f.26 '11. View looking towards the valley of the Toracuddu River.
13. f.29 '12. View across the upper or western end of Michael's Valley looking south. Hamilton and an attendant stalking sambur.
14. f.31 '13. Panoramic view of the great plateau and the Arney Moodie Mountain looking west. Leopard in foreground and ibex grazing.
15. f.33 Vignette. Pooliar village and figures.

== Records of Sport ==
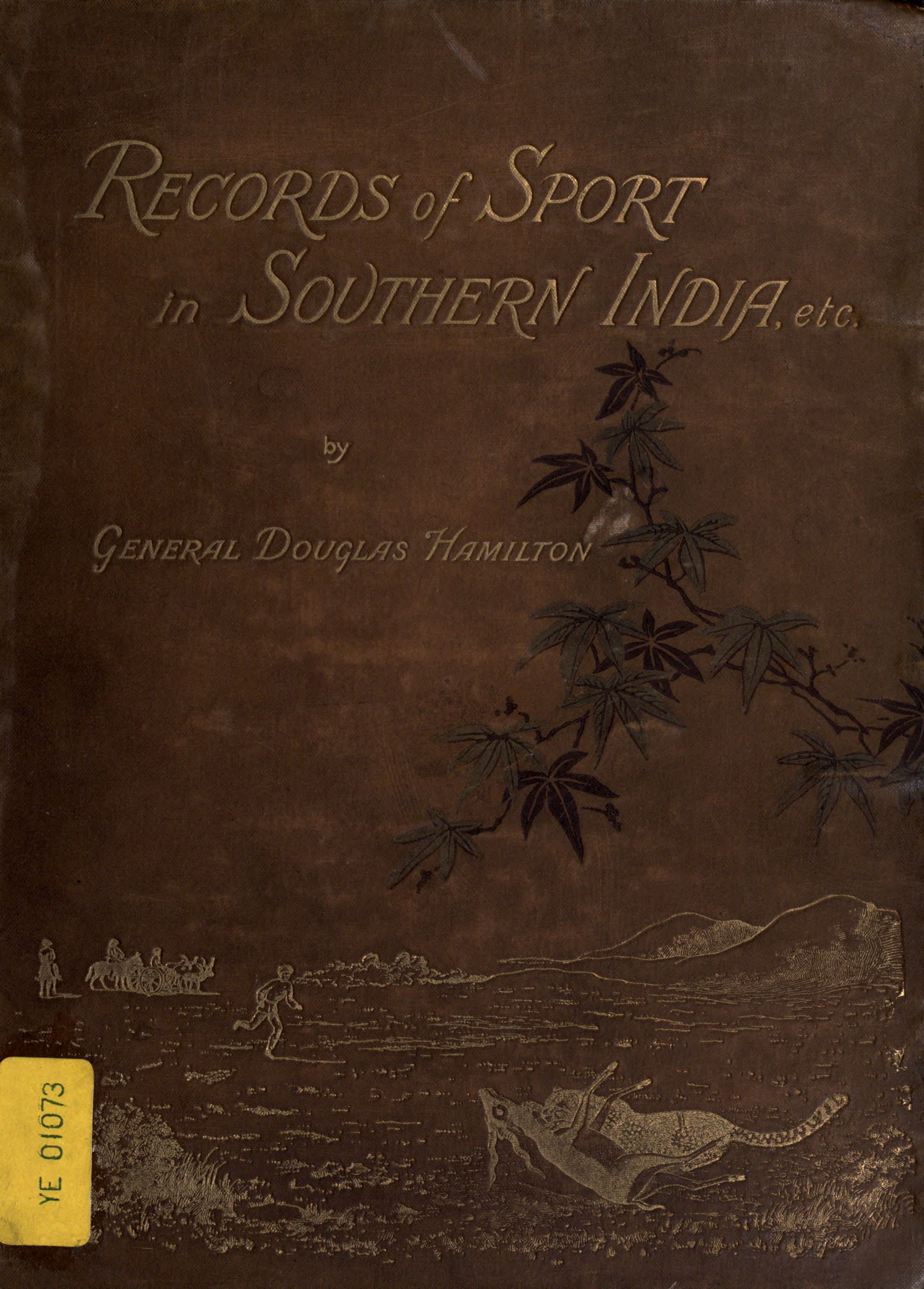
Leather cover of Records of Sport in Southern India...

Hamilton's brother Edward was the editor of Douglas Hamilton's 1892 autobiography, "Records of Sport in Southern India, Chiefly on the Annamullay, Nielgherry and Pulney Mountains, also Including Notes on Singapore, Java and Labuan, ...". It is about "years long gone by when the muzzle loader, with all its drawbacks, was the chief weapon in use." All ninety five drawings in Records of Sport... (with the exception of three) were taken from his sketch books. All scenes illustrated in these drawings are based on the actual hunting experiences of Colonel Hamilton described in full detail in his Autobiography.

Those he drew in Indian ink were transferred as facsimiles by means of photo-etching. The others, sketched in pencil, were copied by Mr. J. T. Smit with such care and accuracy that the touch, as well as the spirit, of the original sketches was fully retained. The three plates of the two species of florican and of the jungle cat are from drawings made expressly for Records of Sport by Mr. Smit. Several types of big game are the primary subject of most of these drawings. Only a few of the drawings overlap with those in the India Office collection. He also drew several landscapes of Singapore, Java and Labuan during his visit there in 1848. The drawings are:

=== Galleries of 95 drawings ===
- Portrait of Major Douglas Hamilton, 1870. . . Frontispiece

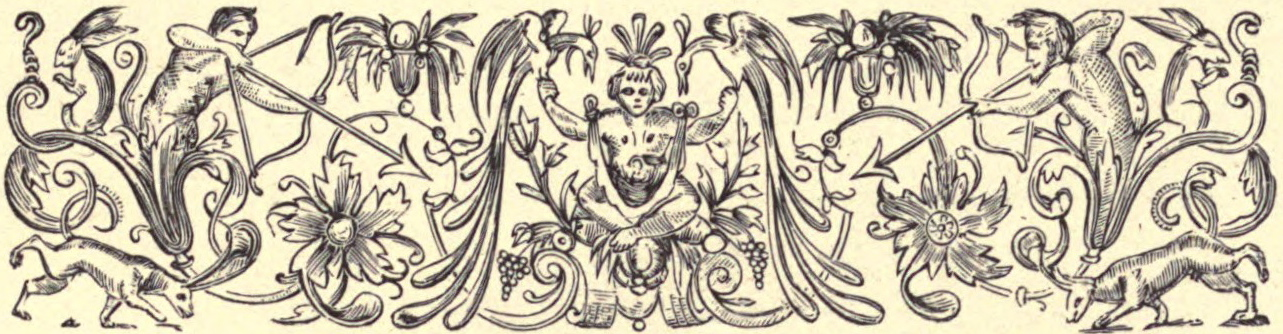

- Preface art...v:

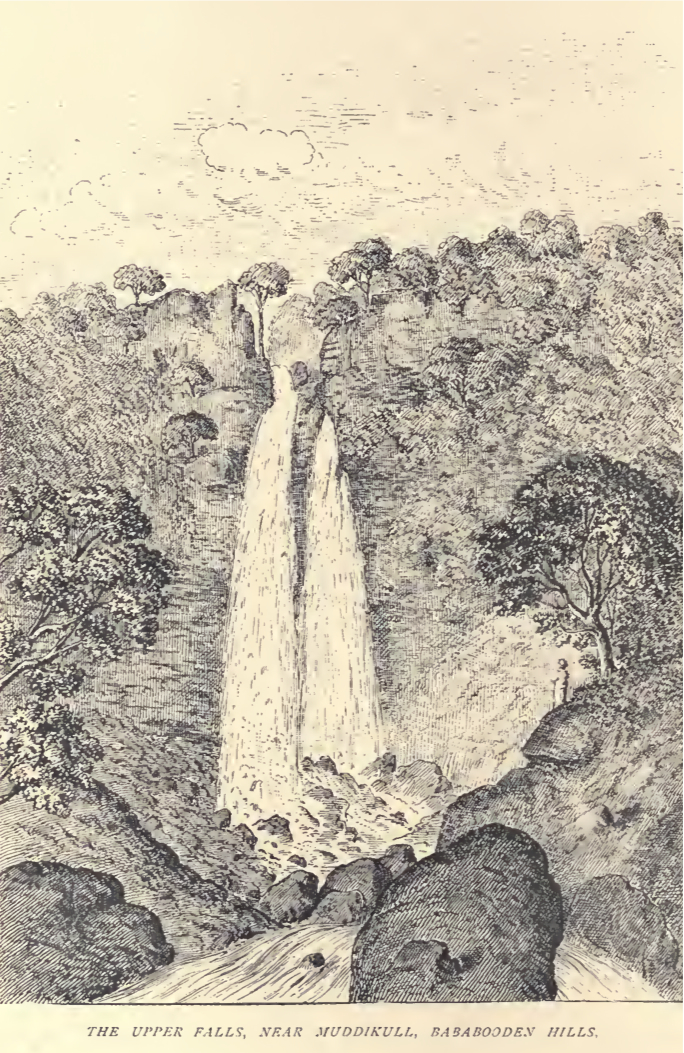
Upper falls near Muddikull, Bababooden hills...xxxvi

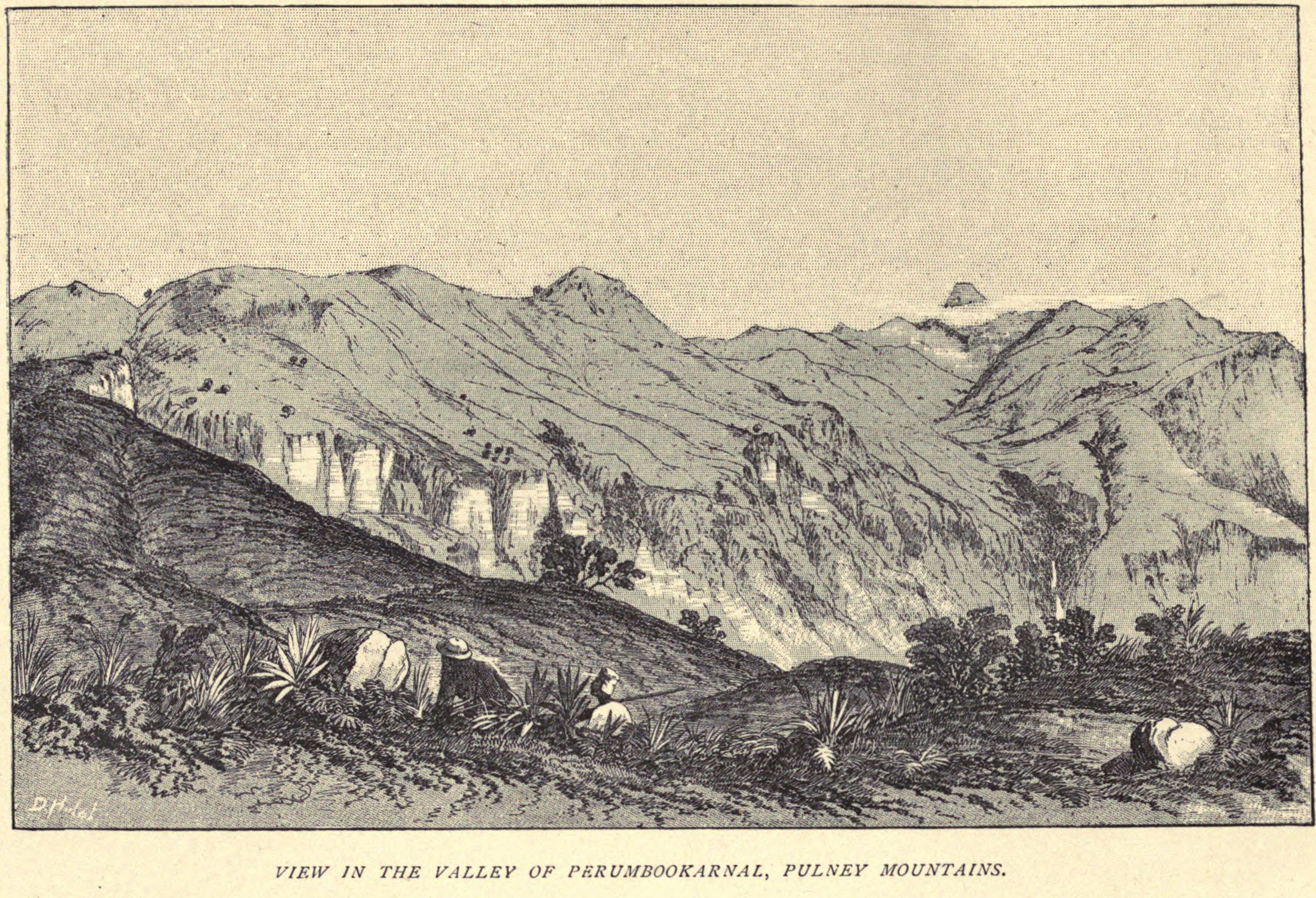
Valley of Perumbookarnal, Pulney mountains...xv

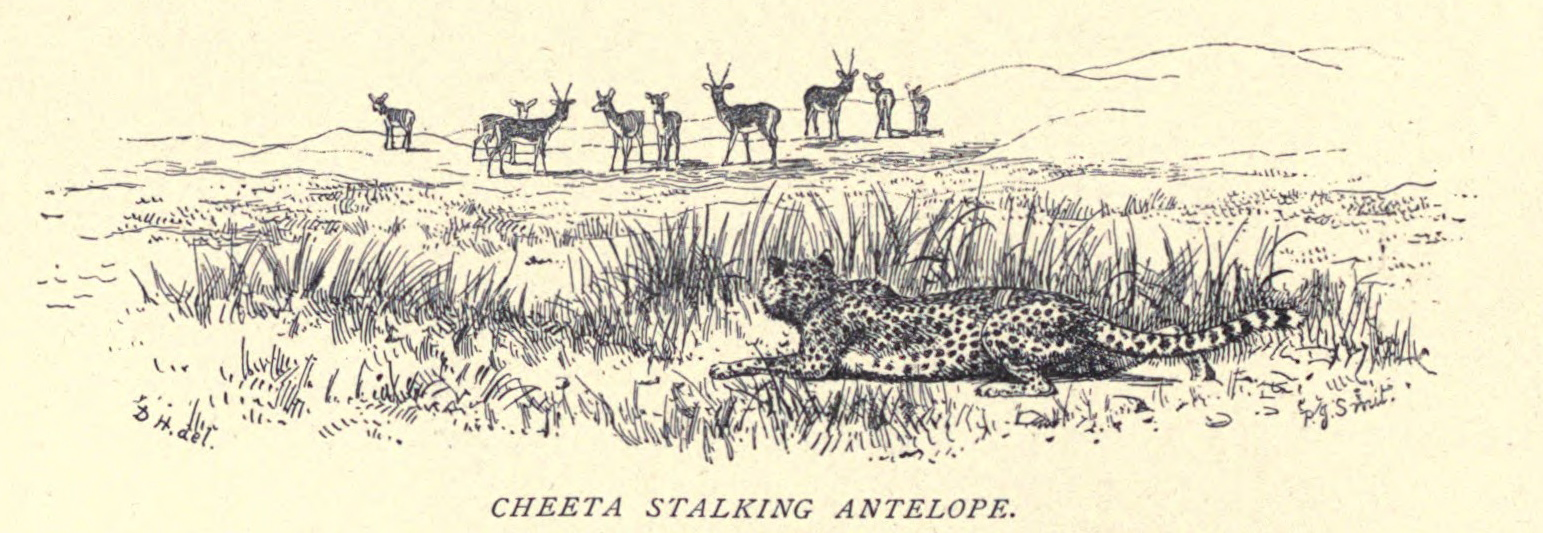
Cheetah stalking Antelope...10

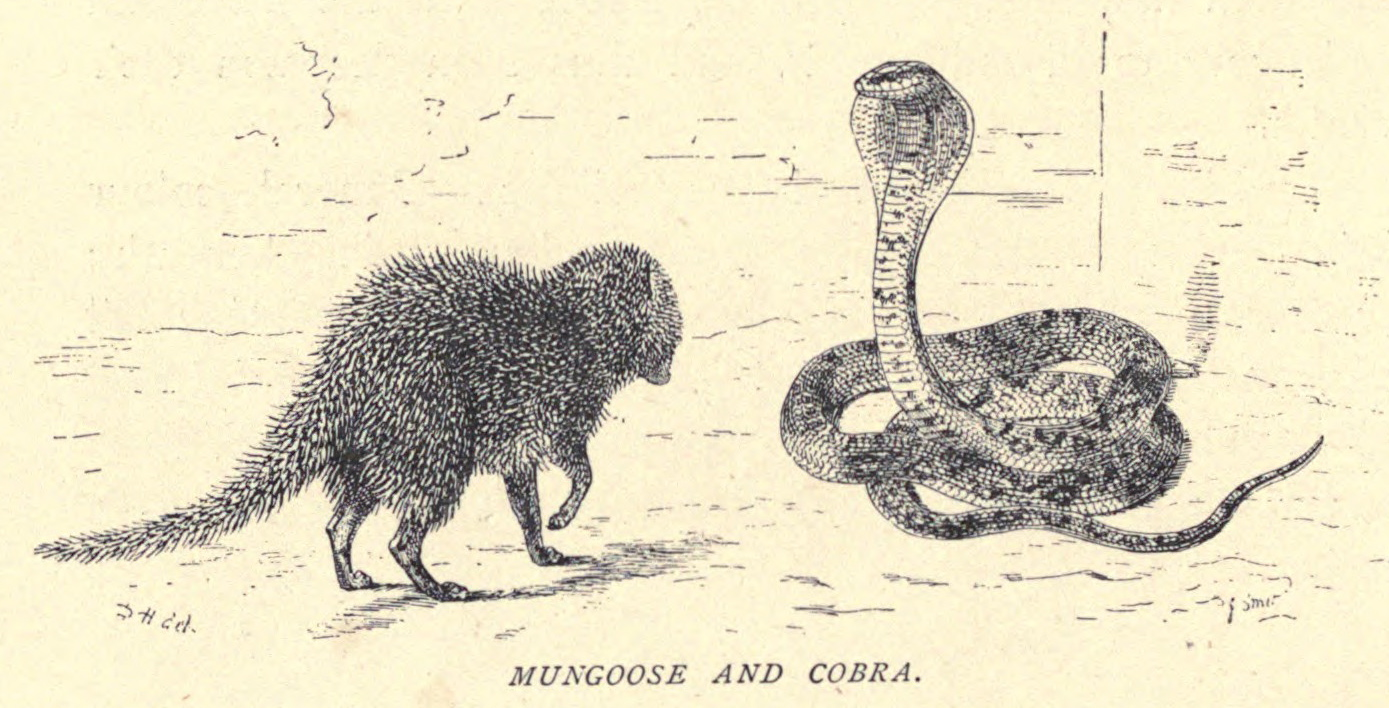
Mungoose and Cobra...28

PREFACE

1. The Pillar Rocks, Pulney Mountains . . . xiii
2. Water Fall near the Village of Killiyur . . .viii
3. View in the Valley of Perumbookarnal, Pulney Mountains...xv
4. Lake of Yercaud, Shervaroy Hills ...xviii
5. The Upper Falls, near Muddikull, Bababoopen Hills...xxxvi

CHAPTER I. - Shooting Antelope

1. Stalking Antelope with Pony...1
2. Spearing the Antelope...5
3. The Silver Grey Fox (Canis bengalensis)...7
4. Oh, Great King, Don't be Angry...9
5. Cheeta Stalking Antelope...10
6. The Kill...11
7. The Mountain Antelope...14
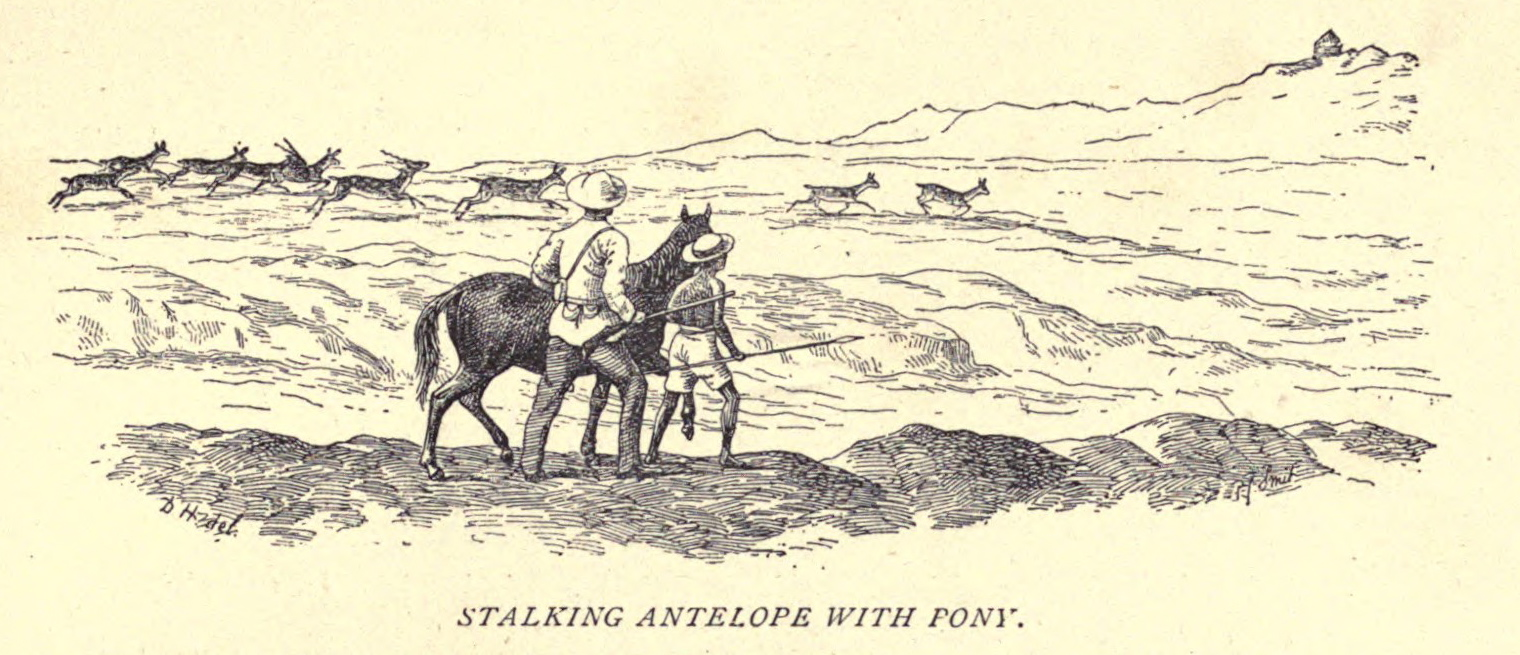
Stalking Antelope with Pony...1

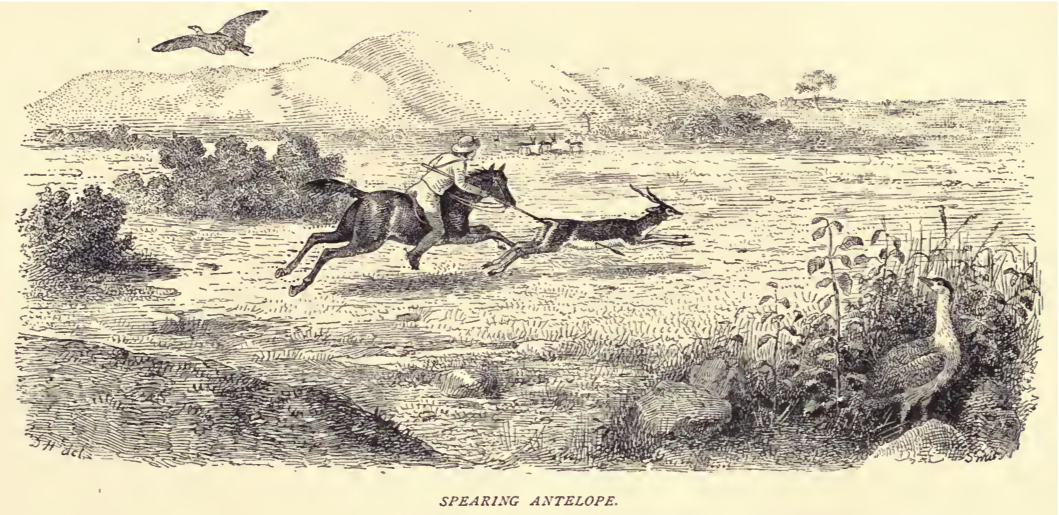
Spearing Antelope...5

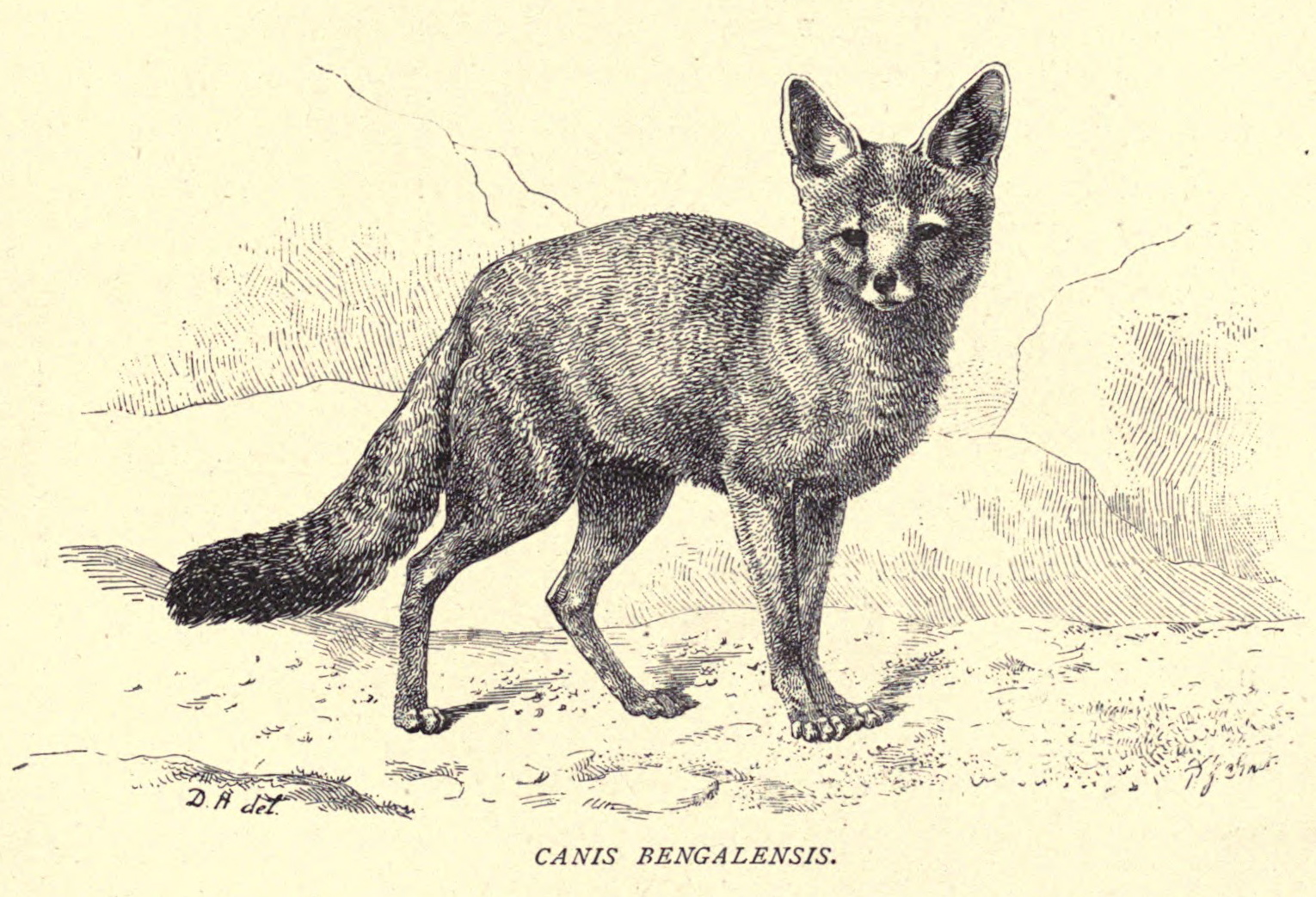
Wild Dog, Canis bengalensis...7

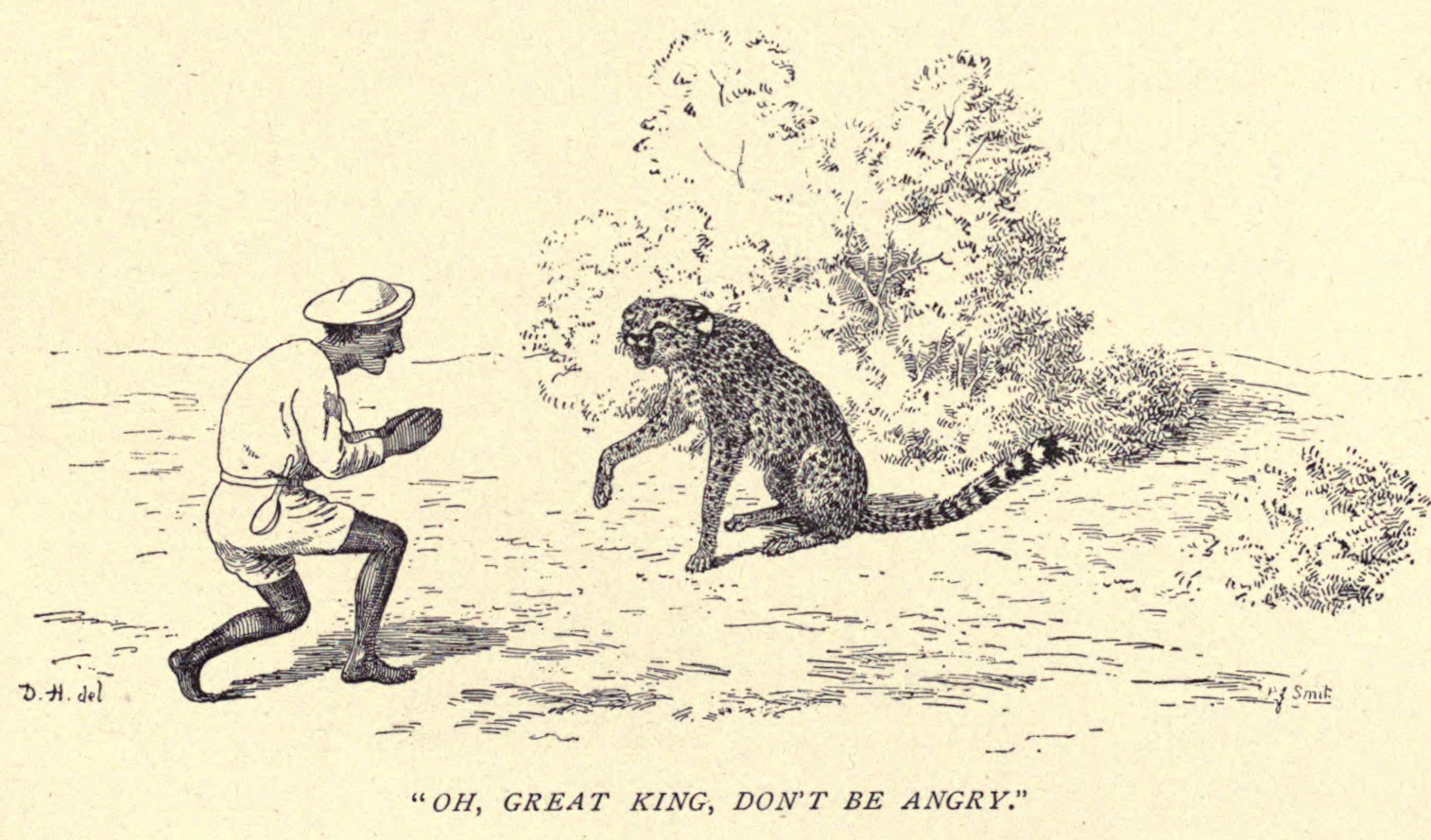
Oh, Great King, Don't be Angry...9

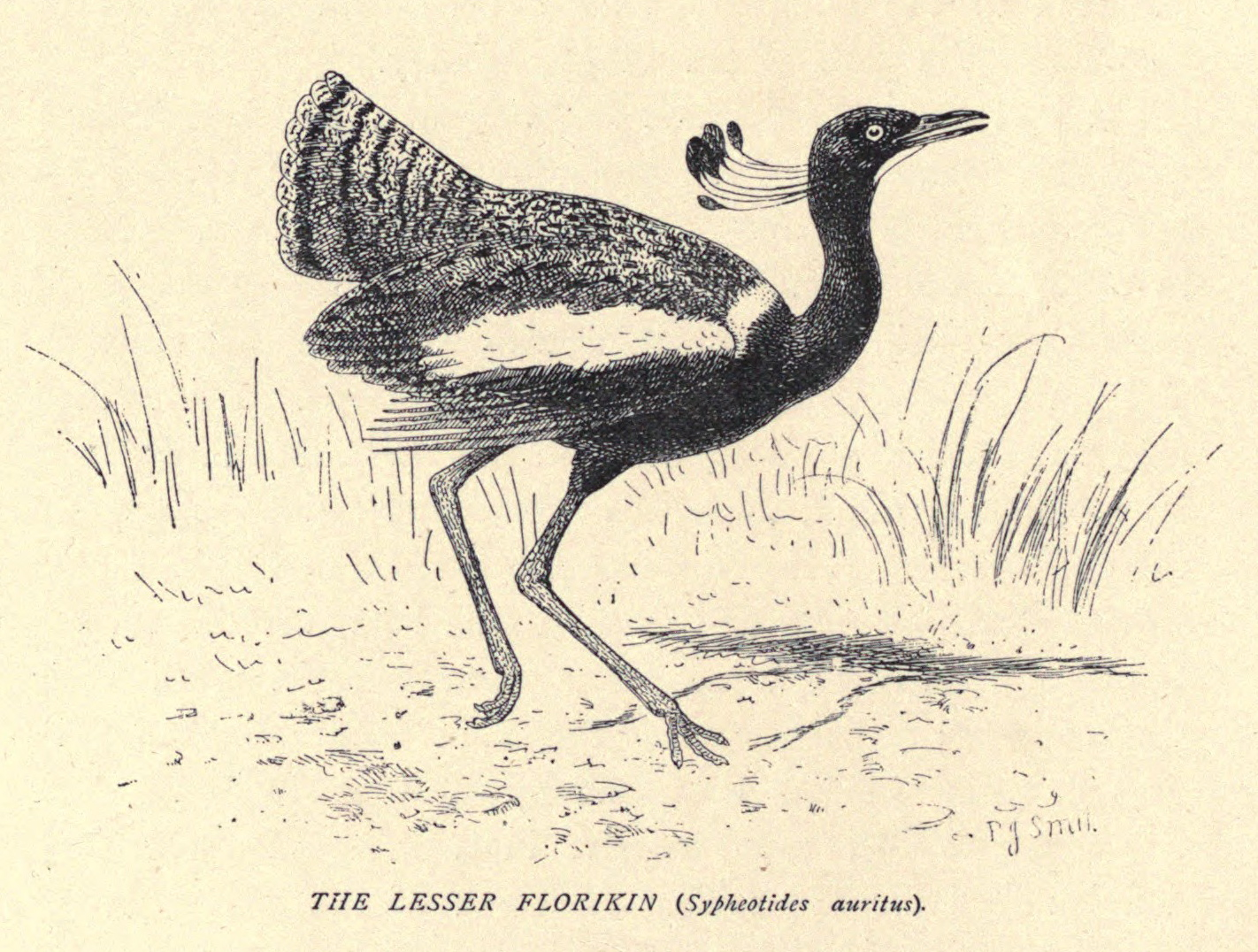
Lesser Florican...36

CHAPTER II. - Wolves, Wild Dogs, Boars, Mongoose, Small Game Shooting

1. Wolves Watching Antelope...19
2. Wild Dogs (Cuon rutilans)...25
3. Mungoose and Cobra...28
4. Rather a Stopper...31
5. A Brave Boar...33
6. The Lesser Florikin (Syphcolides auritus)...36
7. The Bengal Florican (Spyheoides bengaleiuis)...36
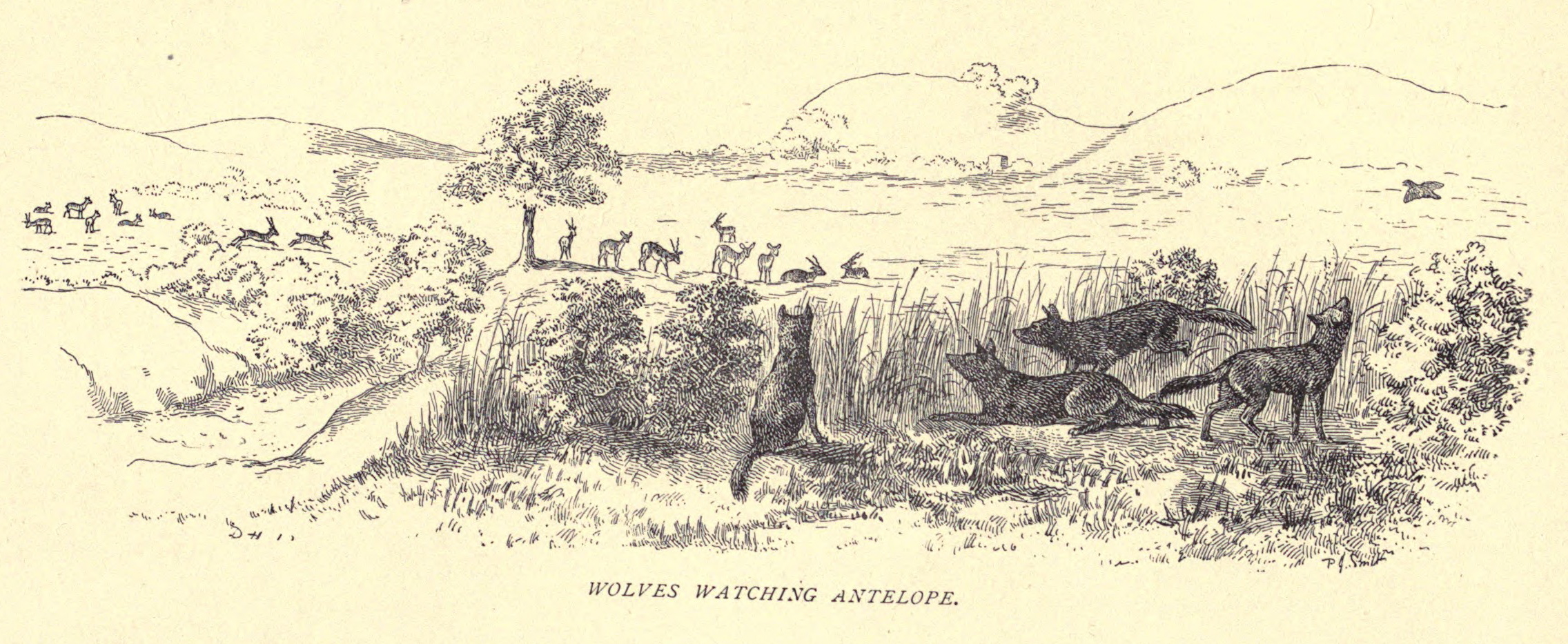
Wolves Watching Antelope...19

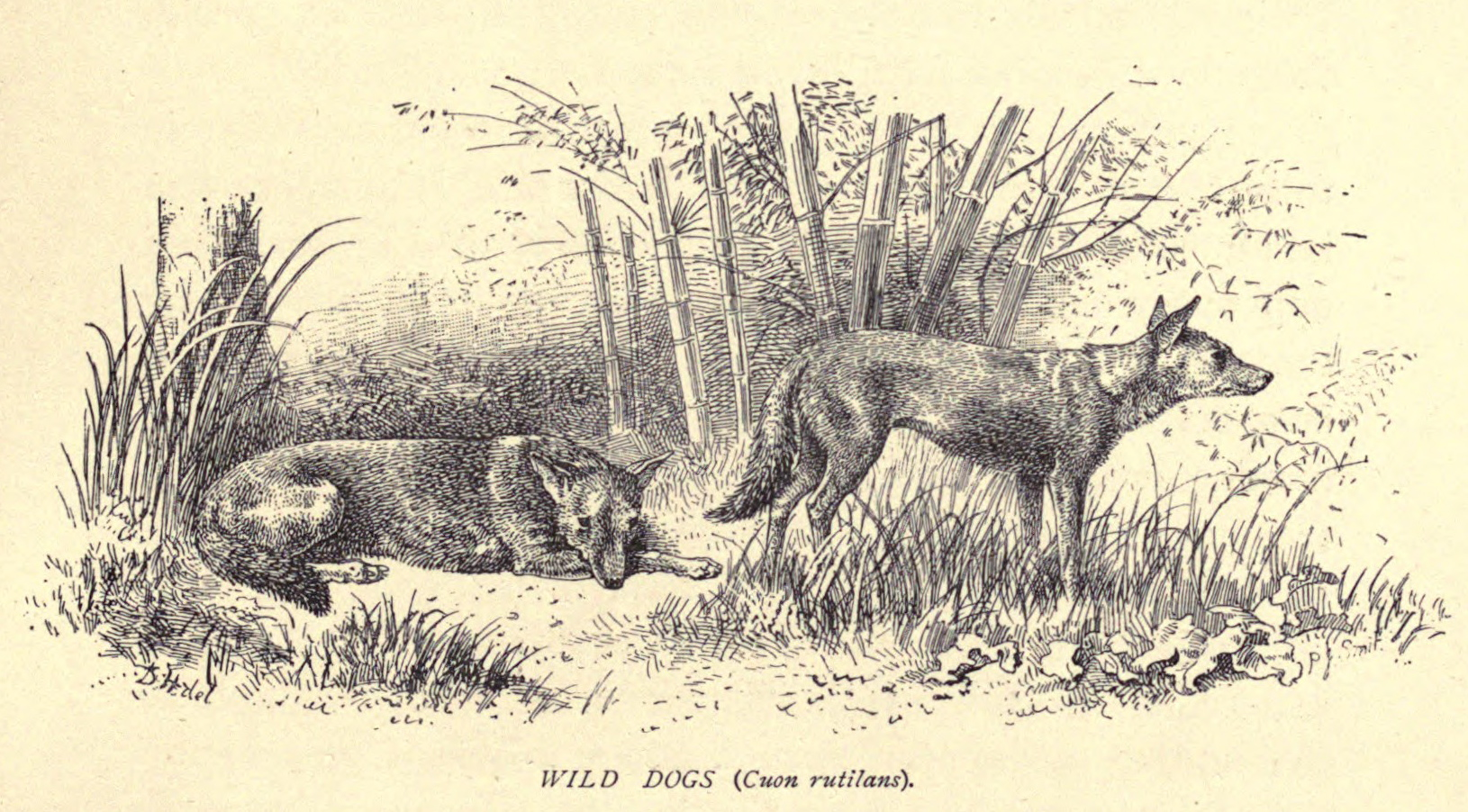
Wild Dogs, (Cuon rutilans)...25

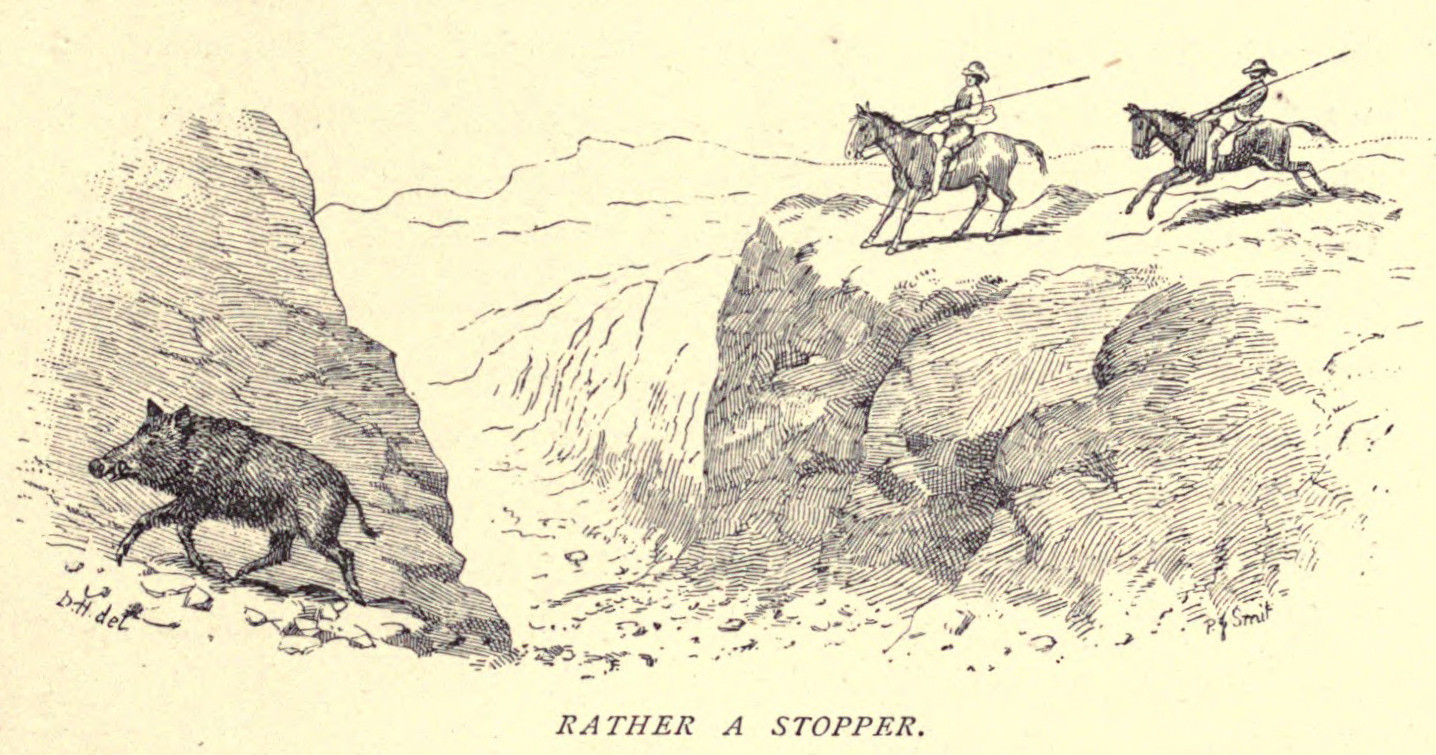
Rather a Stopper...31

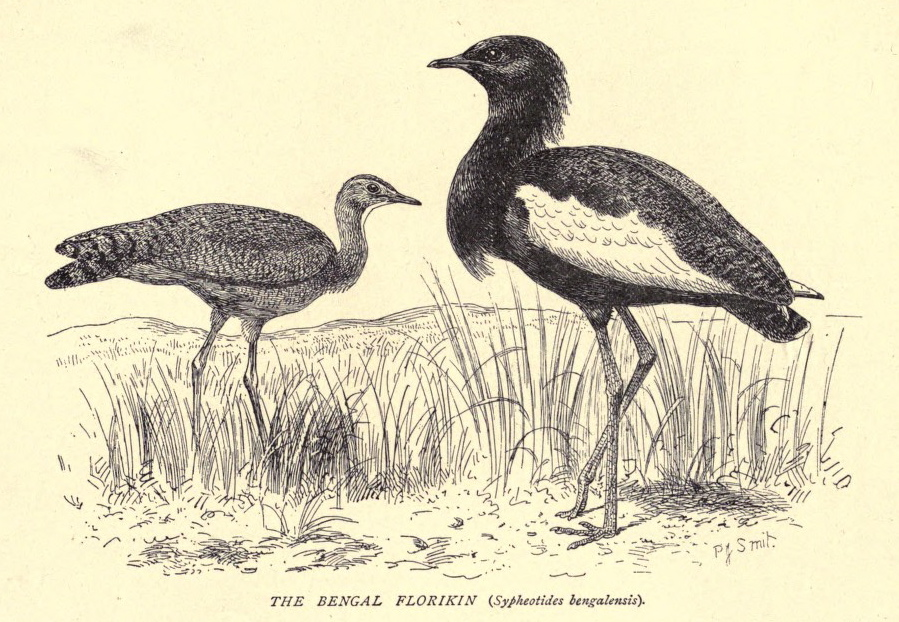
Bengal Florican...36

CHAPTER III. - Sporting Trip to the Dandilly Forest

1. The Bungalow, Dandilly Forest...39
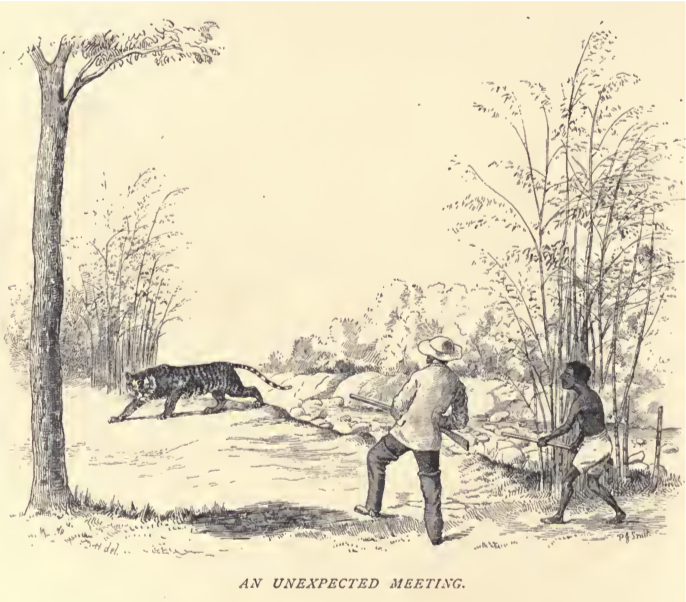
  Unexpected Meeting...50
2. "I Just saw His Head and Horns"...44
3. "Emam Took up the Track"...47
4. An Unexpected Meeting...50

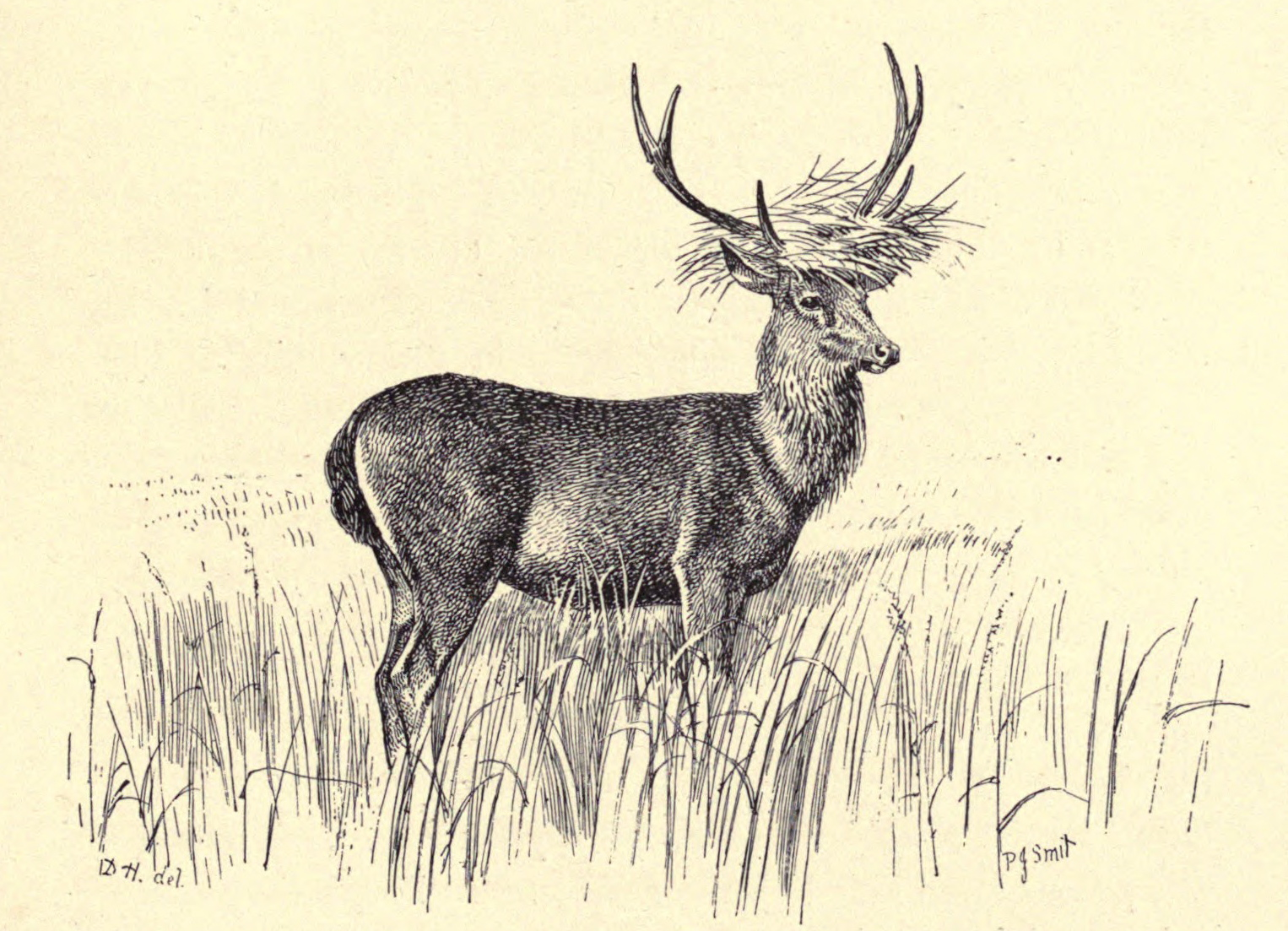
Curious Hat of the Rusa Deer in Java...89

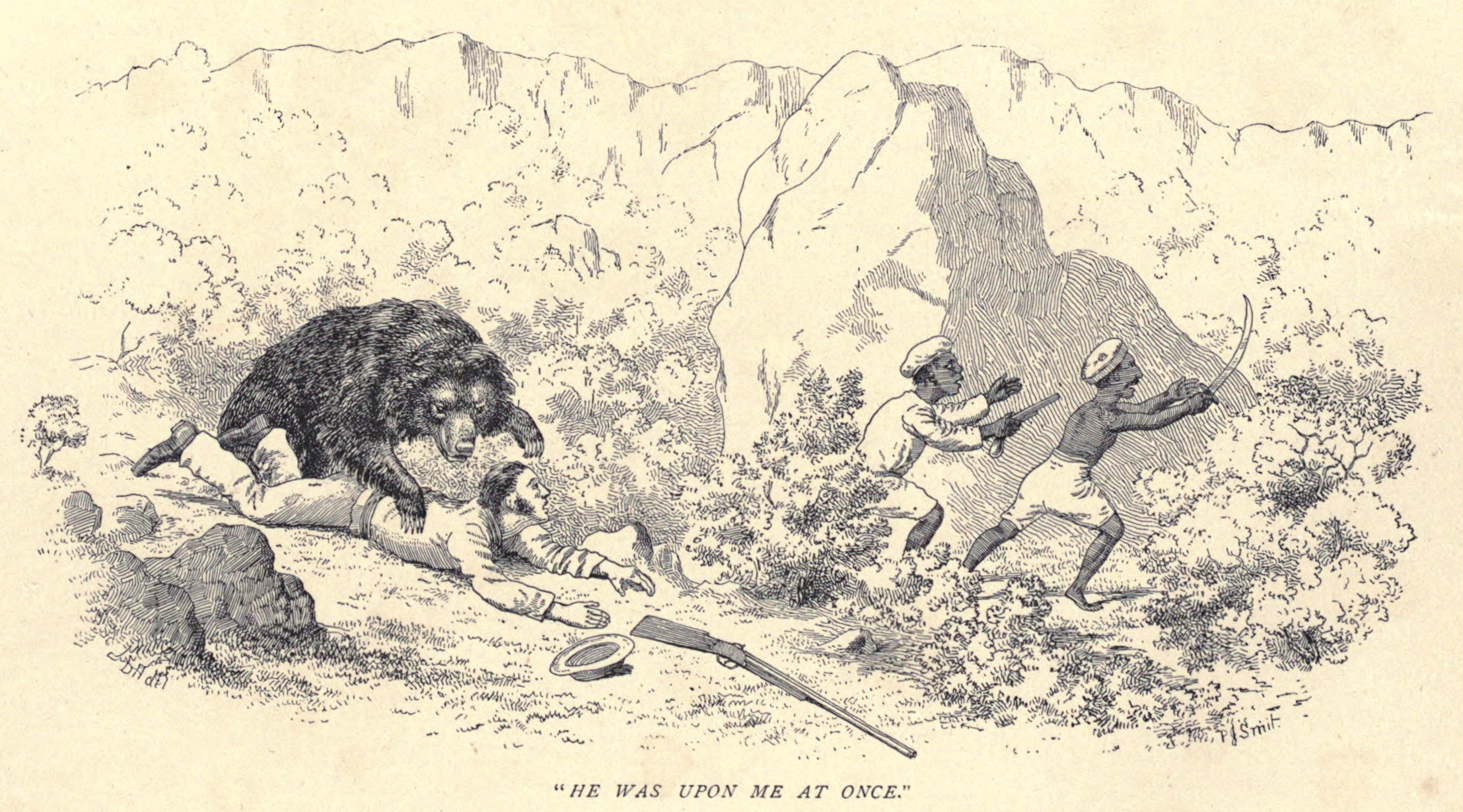
"He was Upon Me at Once"...104

CHAPTER IV. - Singapore, Java and Labuan

1. The Wart Hog of Java (Sus verrucosus)...59
2. The Smero from Paparawang...62
3. Birdseye View of the Crater of the Bromo...68
4. Outline of the Smeroe and the Bromo...68
5. Lake of Ranio Clakka...72
6. Principal Figure in the Temple of Sookoo...77
7. Stone Slabs in the Temple of Sookoo, showing the manufacture of the Kriss ....78 . to face
8. After Deer, Bandoeng...84
9. Curious Hat of the Rusa Deer in Java...89
10. The Big Boar of Labuan (Sus barbatus)...95
11. Nests of a Diminutive Bee found at Labuan...96

CHAPTER V. - Bears

1. He tried hard to get at us through the Bamboos...99
2. "He was upon me at once"...104
3. "I didn't do it, Ma!"...107
4. I could Hear the Bones Breaking...110

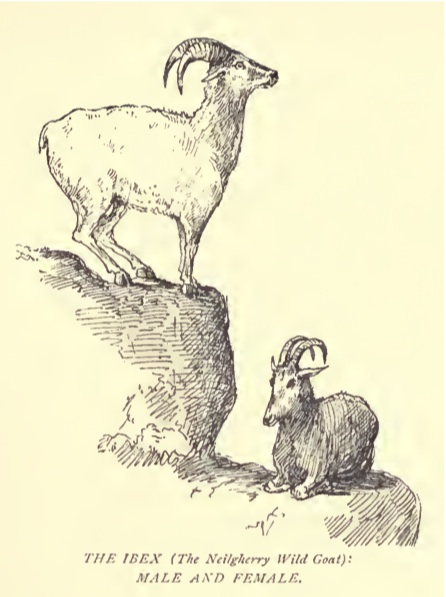
Nilgiri Tahr pair...111

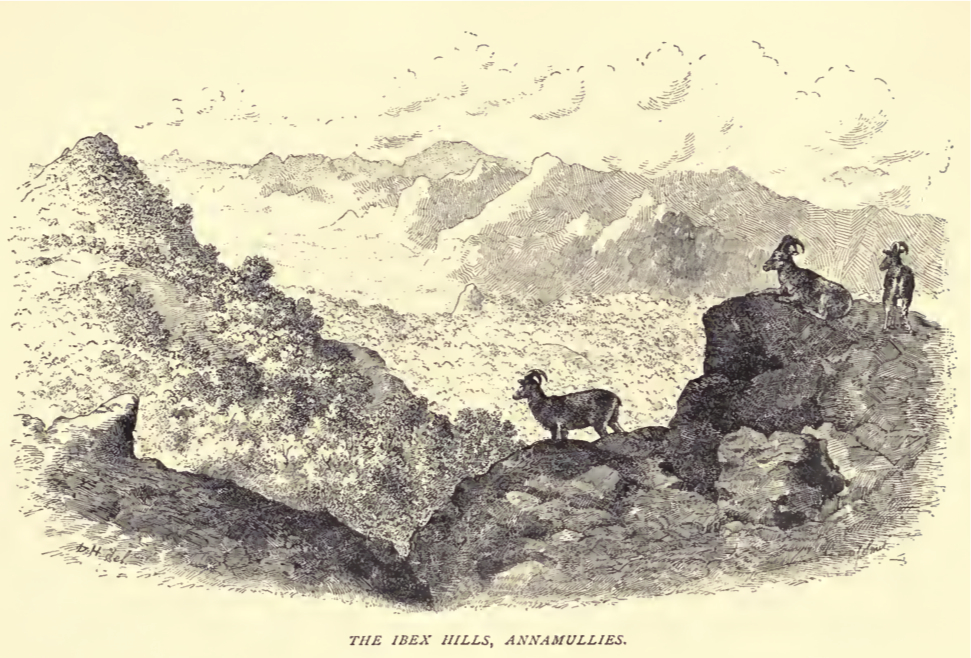
Ibex Hills, Annaimalai...117

CHAPTER VI. - Ibex Shooting on the Nielgherries, Annamullais, and Pulnies

1. The Ibex (The Nielgherry Wild Goat), Male and Female...111
2. The Ibex Hills, Annamullies...117
3. My First Ibex...120
4. The Hut, Pykara...122
5. The Old Saddle-back...124
6. I take off my Shoes...127
7. A Close Shave...129
8. The Ibex Stalker...135
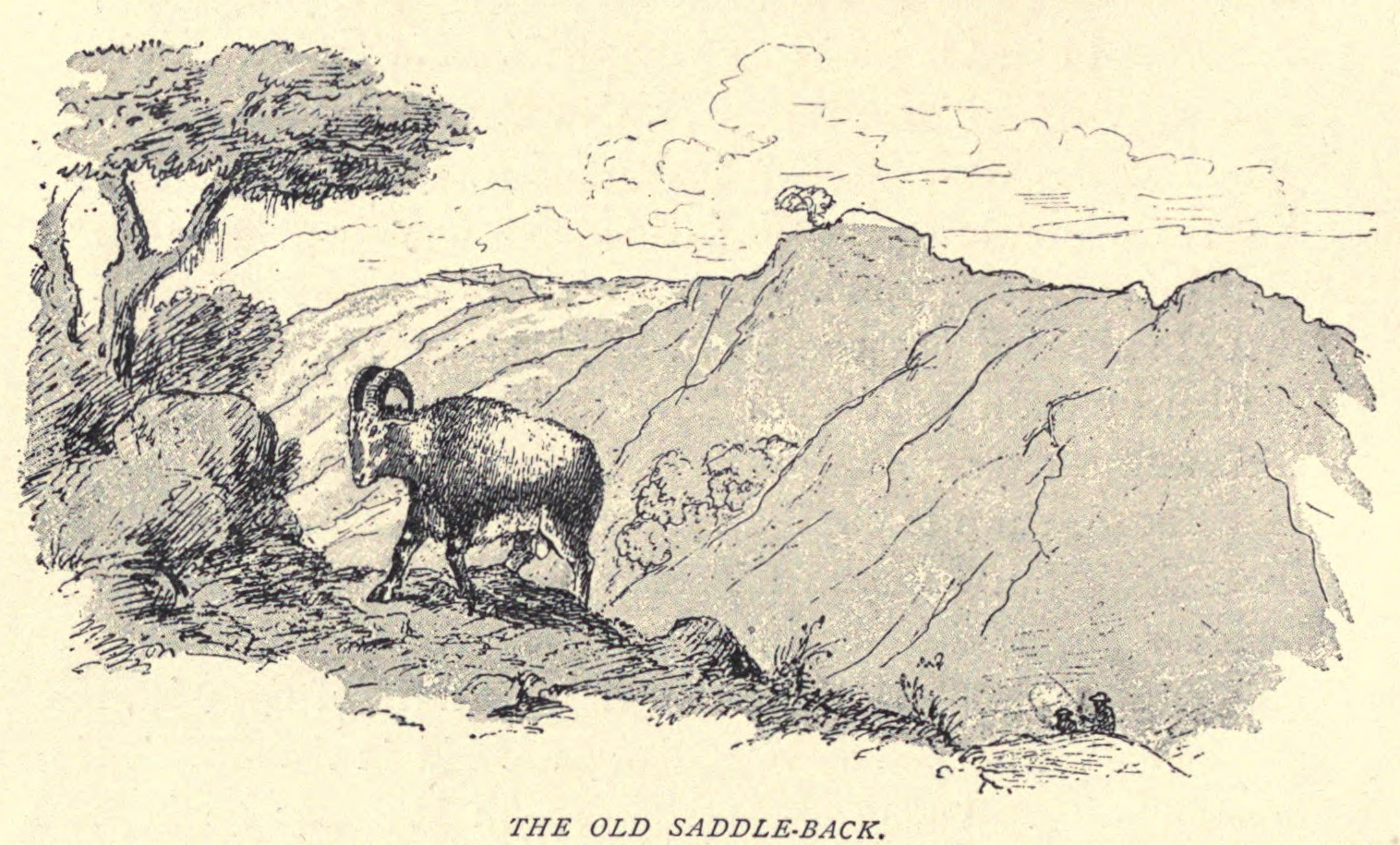
The Old Saddleback...124

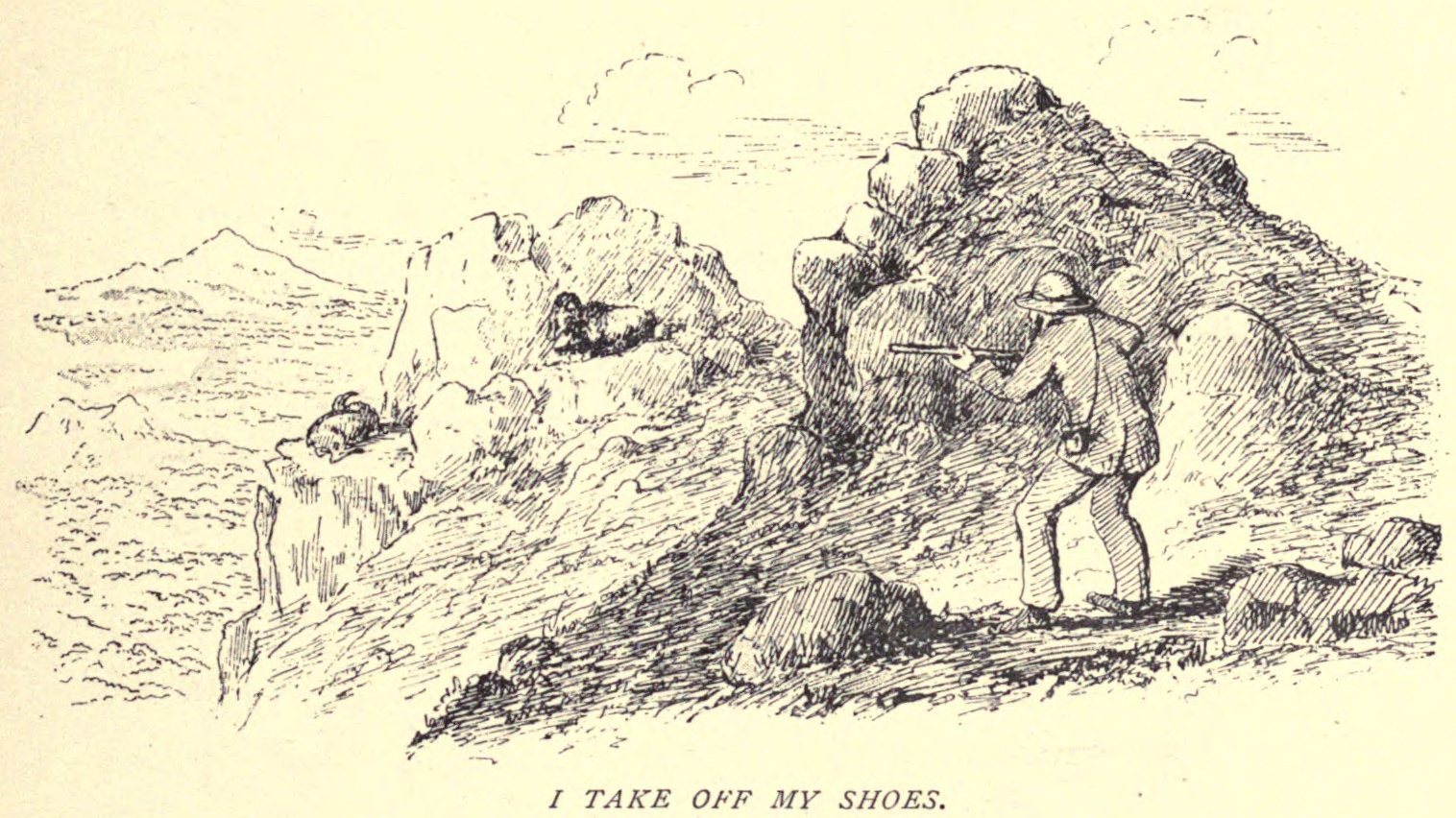
I Take Off My Shoes...127

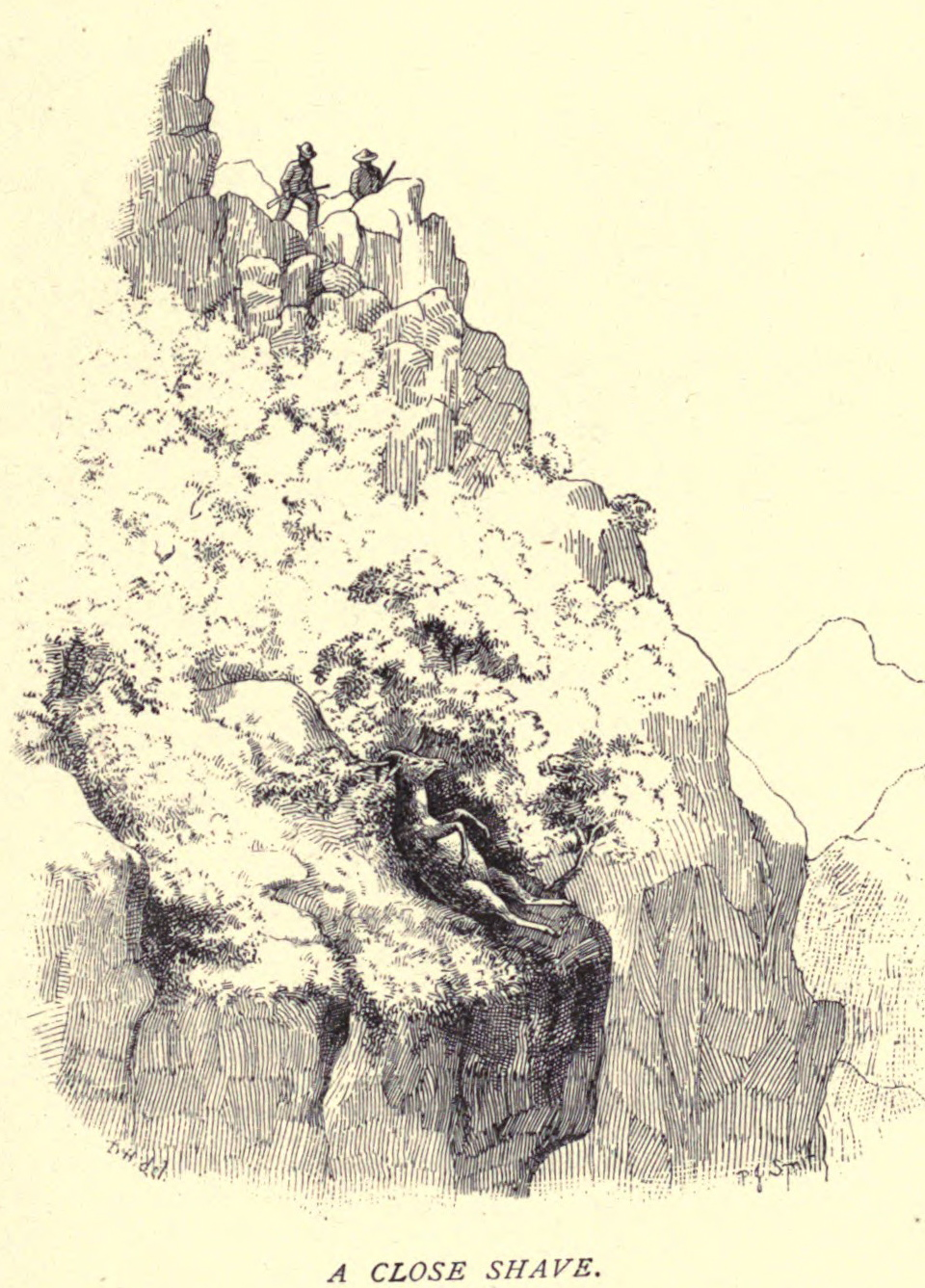
A Close Shave...129

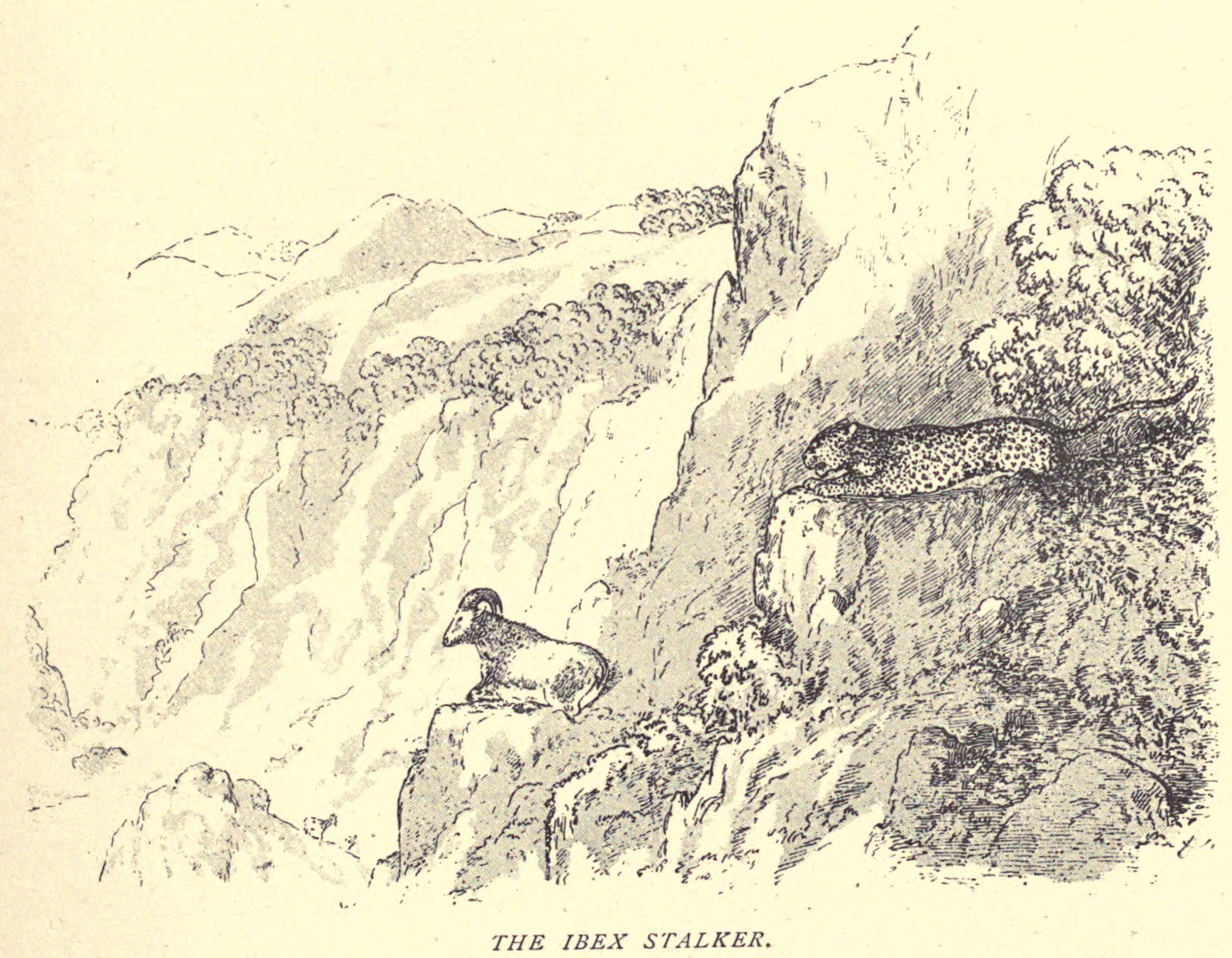
The Ibex Stalker..135

CHAPTER VII. - Elephants

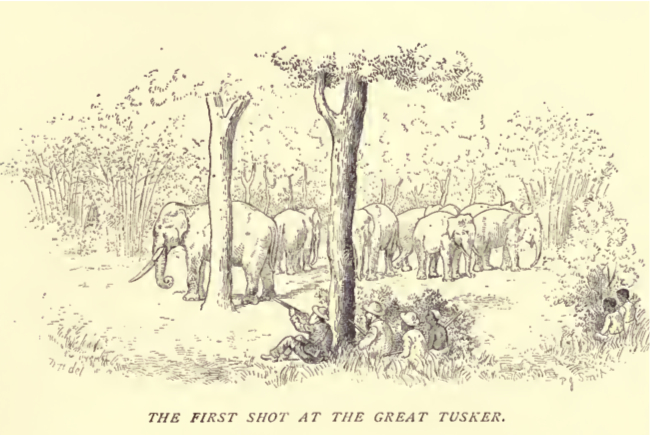
First Shot at the Great Tusker...159

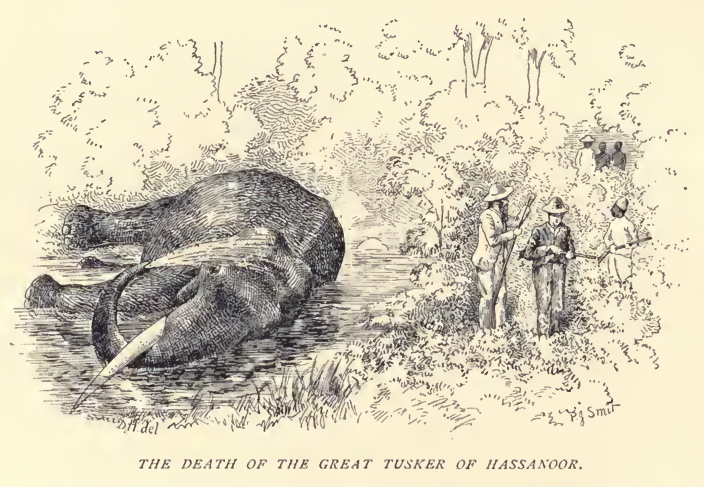
Death of the Great Tusker...160

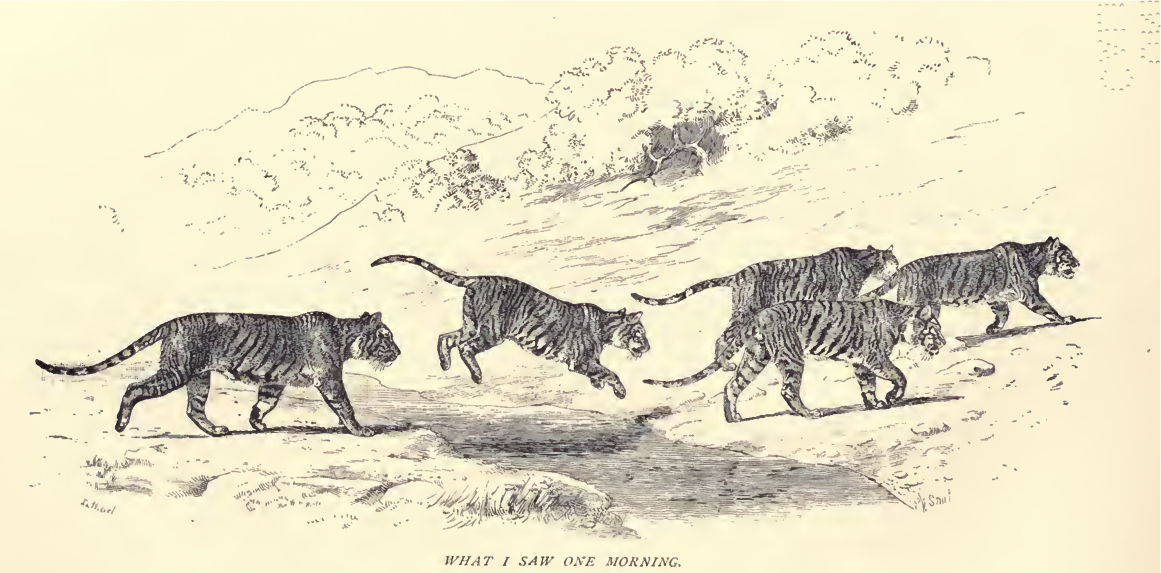
What I saw...202

1. The Knowing Old Engineer...142
2. Diagram for Elephant Shots...145
3. I try to drive him Home...149
4. Charging a Bull Bison, 20 September 1856...151
5. The Tables Turned...154
6. We held on like "Grim Death"...154
7. Help ! Help ! !...155
8. We Secure him at last...155
9. Heels over Head...157
10. The First Shot at the Great Tusker...159
11. The Death of the Great Tusker of Hassanoor...160
12. "BAFFLED" (for description see Chapter VIII)...164

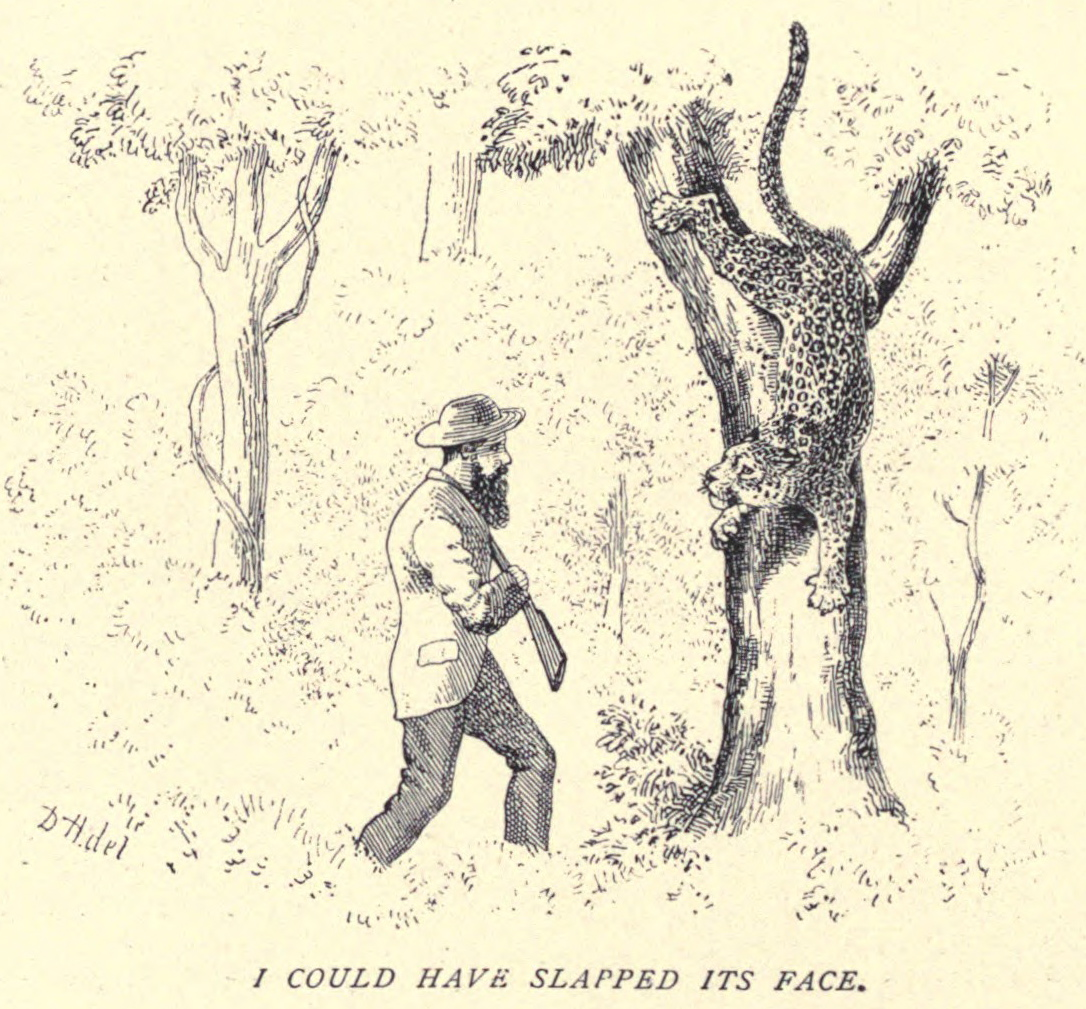
I Could Have Slapped His Face...220

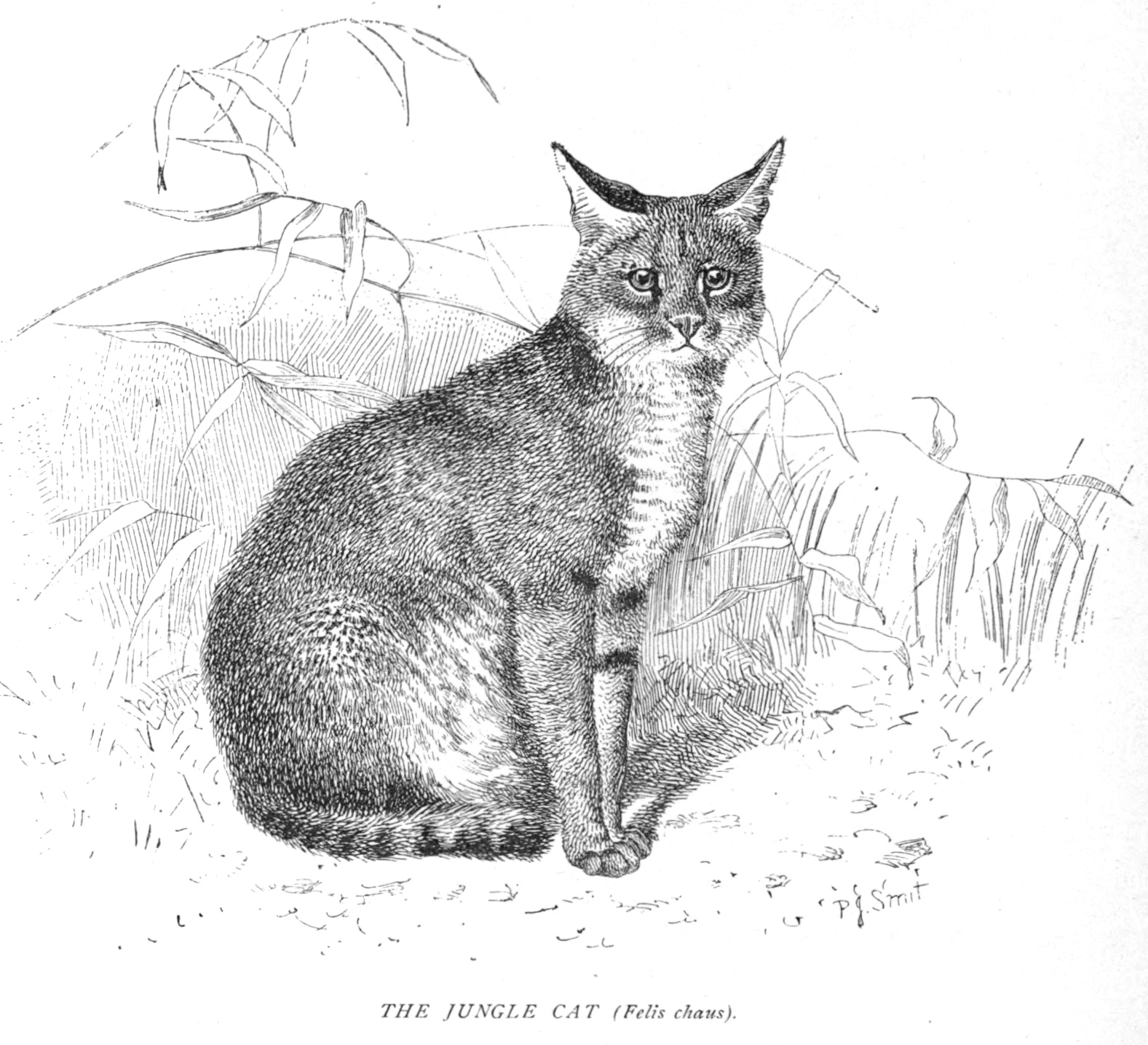
The Jungle Cat (Felis chaus)...223

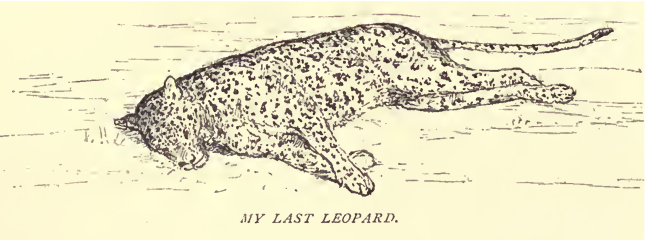
His last leopard, 8 February 1870...235

CHAPTER VIII. - Tigers, Leopards etc.

1. Tigers and Sambur...173
2. The Cheeky Rascal...185
3. A Most Magnificent Bound...188
4. The Vultures Bring Him Out...189
5. Rather a Surprise...191
6. The Mid-Day Siesta...192
7. I staring at him, and He Glaring and Growling...197
8. He stopped to look at me...200
9. What I saw one Morning...202
10. He stood to Listen205
11. Face to Face...209
12. I could have Slapped its Face...220
13. The Jungle Cat (Felis chaus)...223
14. It will Sit and Watch on a Crag...224
15. The Black Leopard...225
16. The Black Leopard— His Death...226
17. The Leopard's Ride...228
18. Leopard on Bough...232
19. My Last Leopard...235
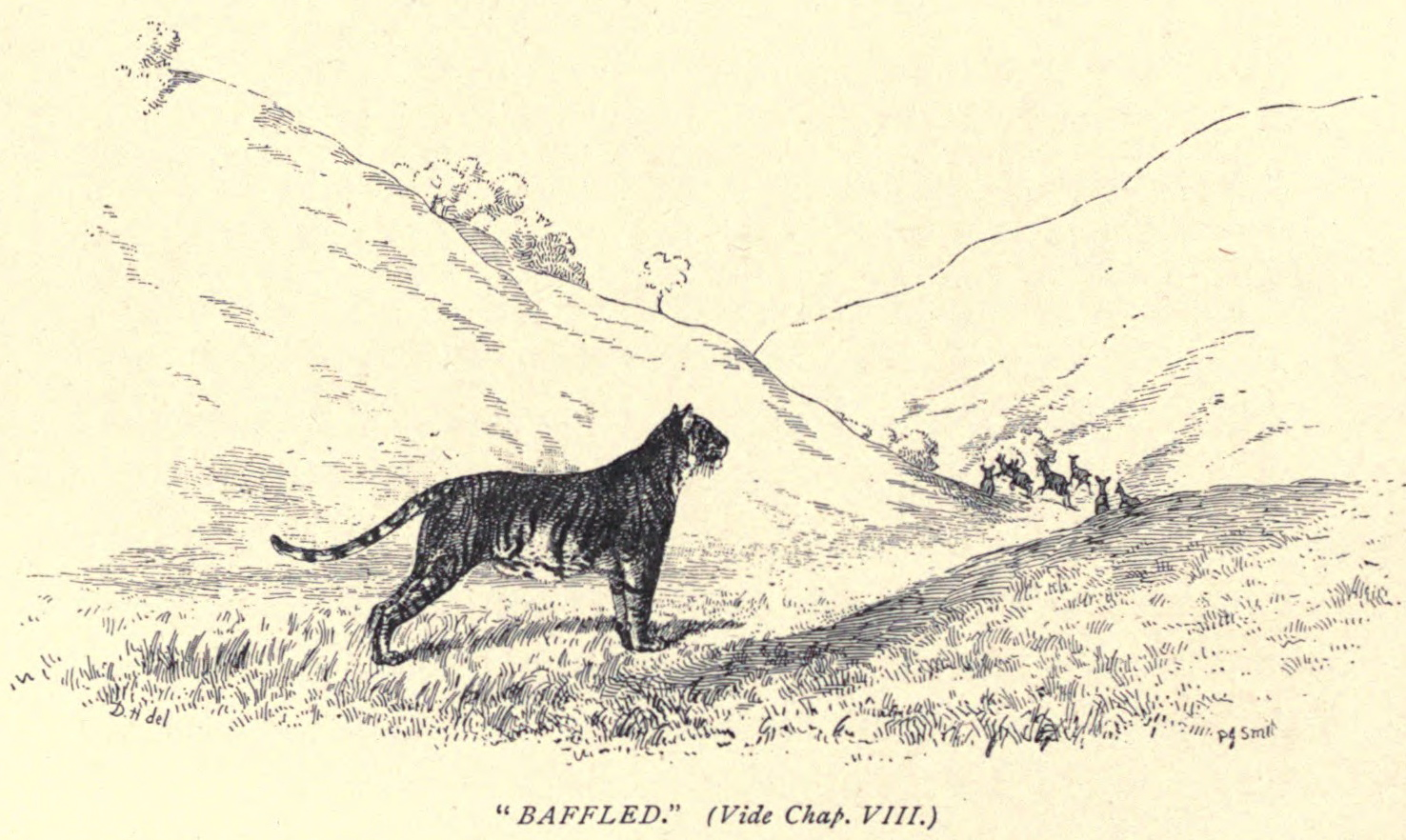
Baffled...164

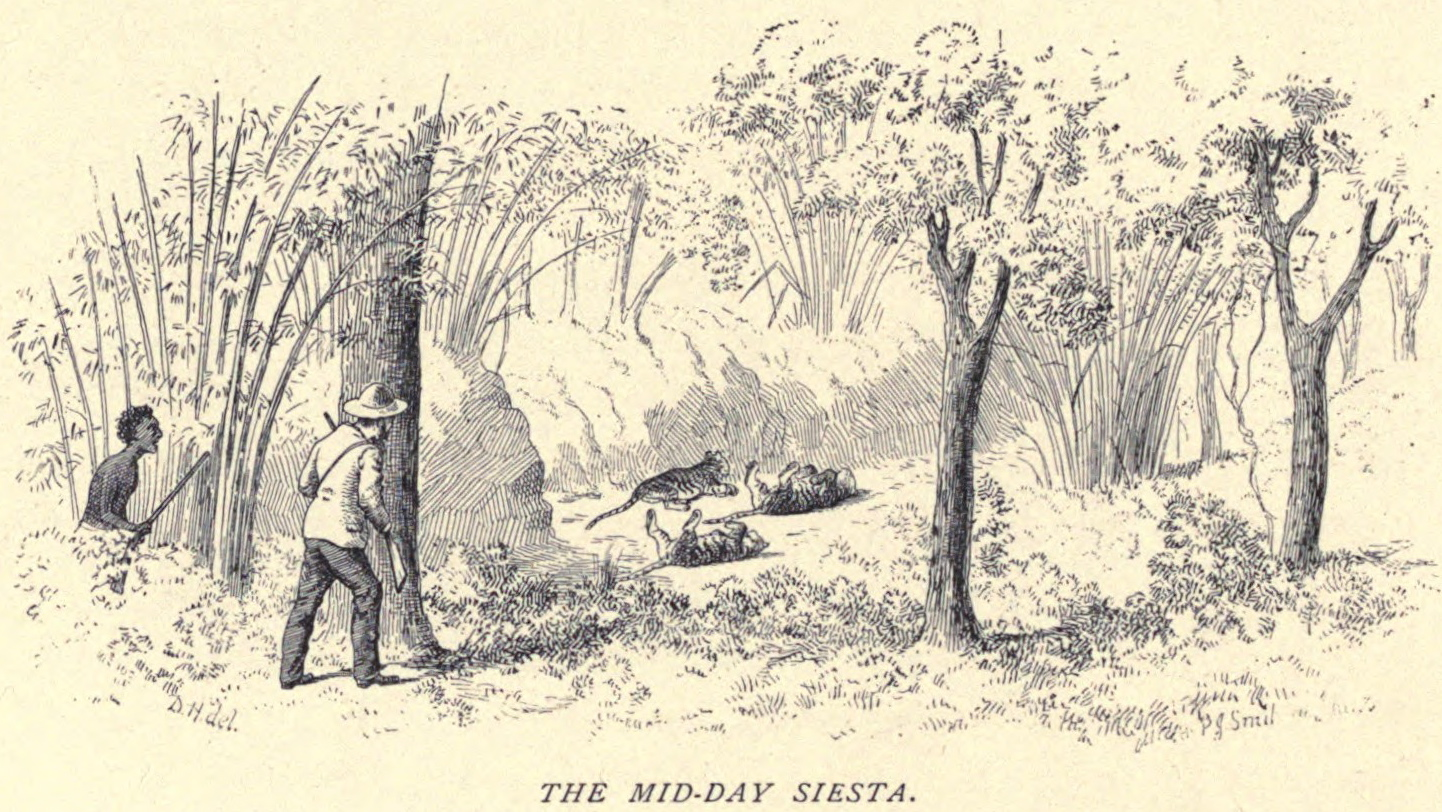
Mid-Day Siesta...192

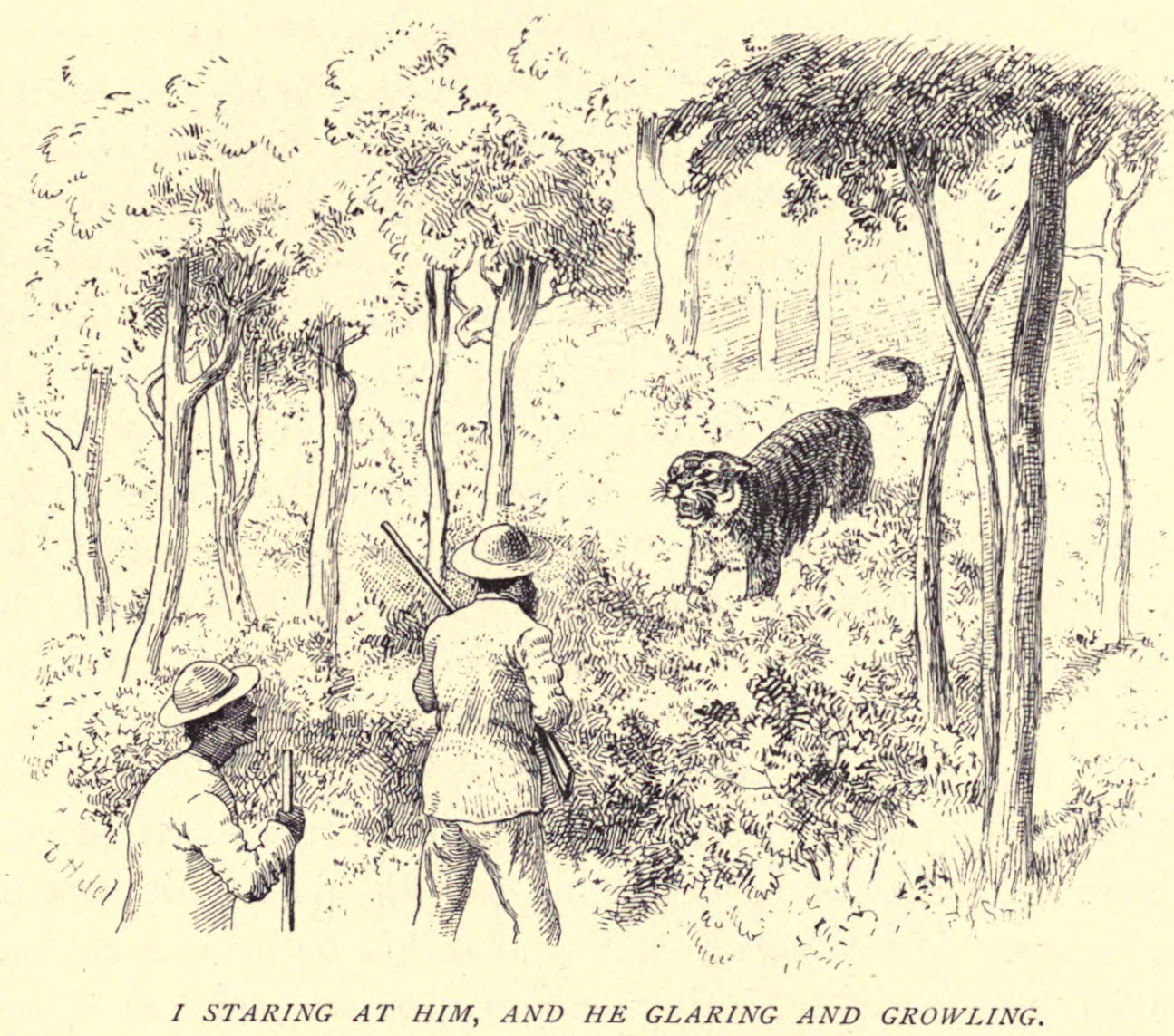
I staring at him, and He Glaring and Growling...197

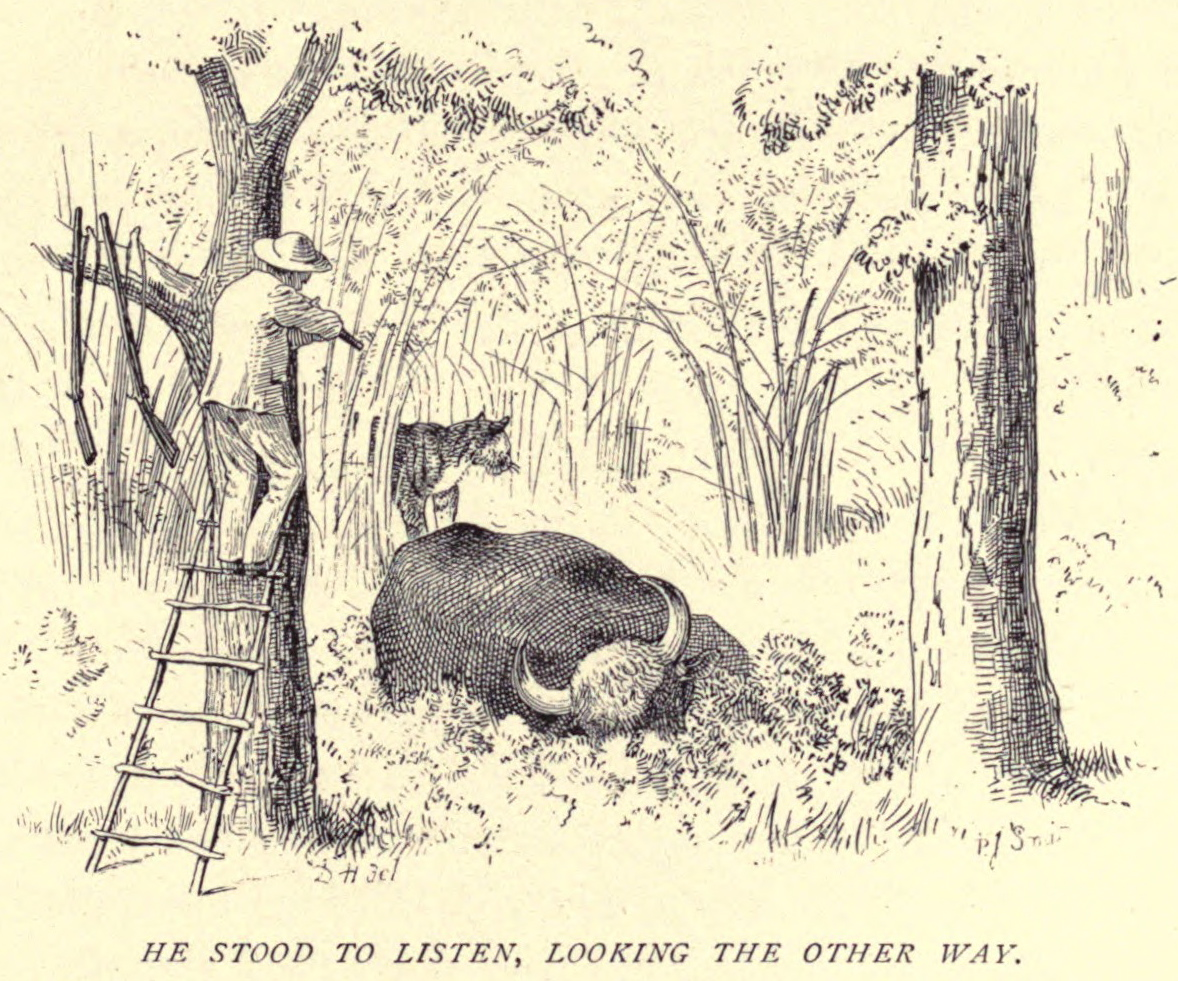
He stood to Listen, I Looking the Other Way...205

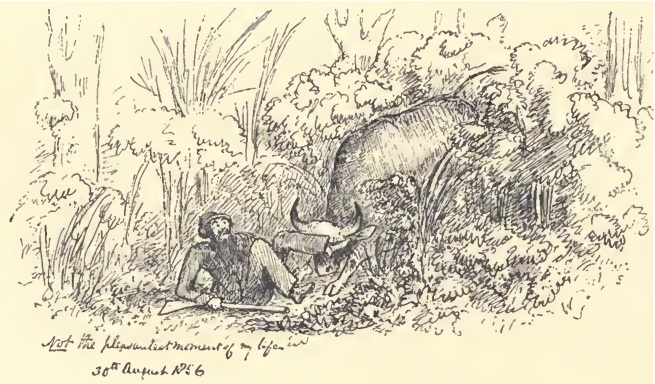
Not the Pleasantest Moment..., 30 Aug. 1856...248

CHAPTER IX. - The Bison of Southern India

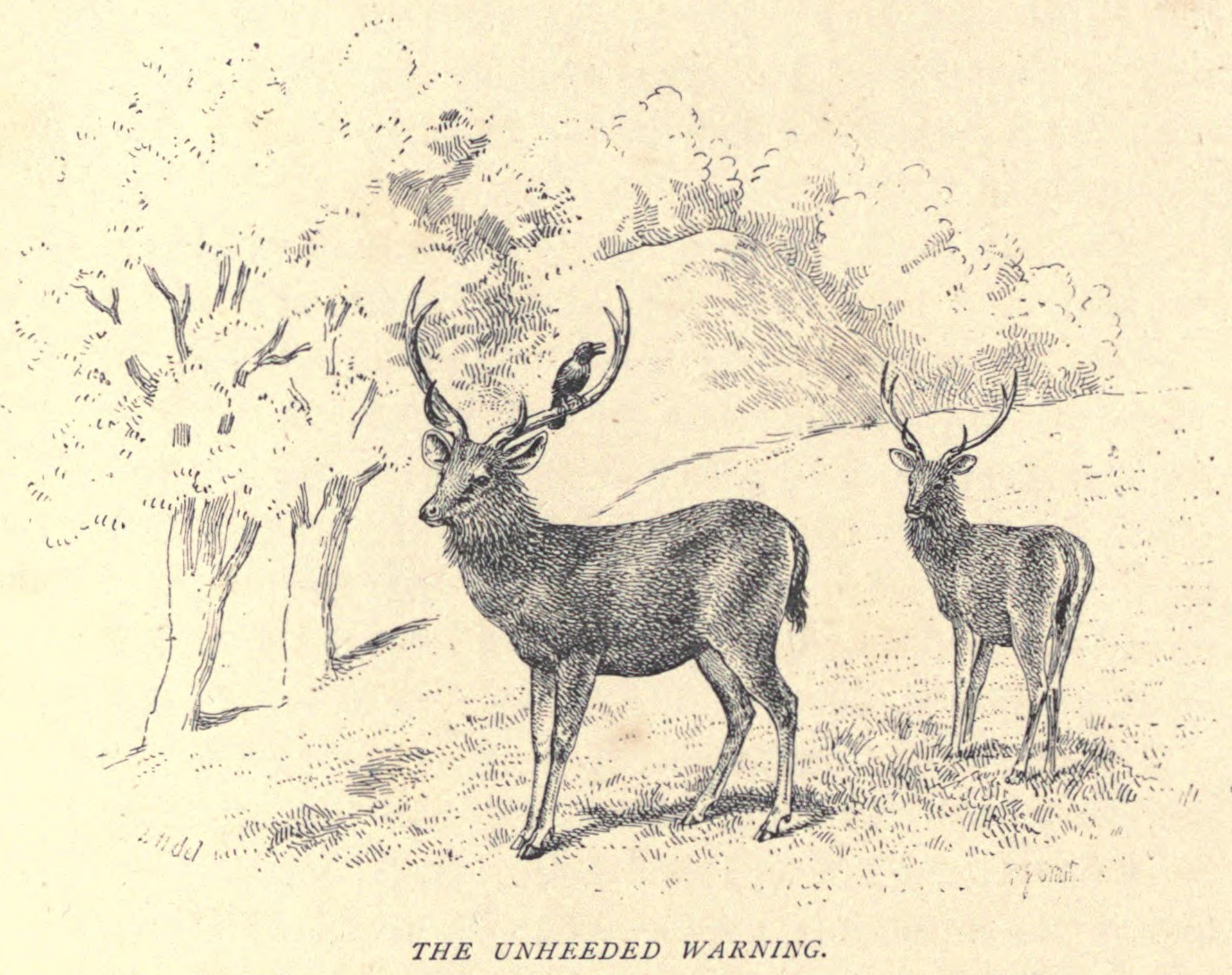
The Unheeded Warning...262

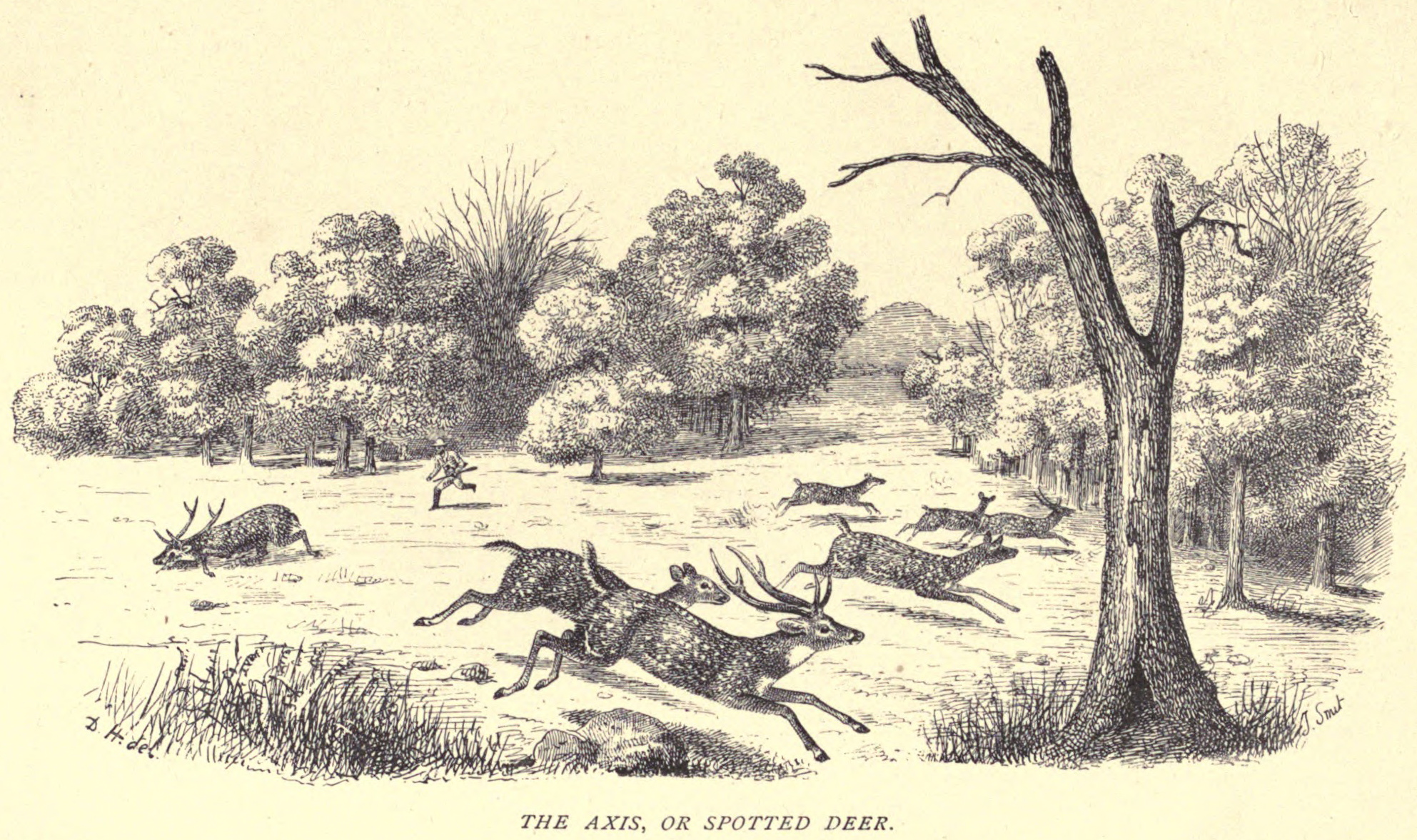
The Axis or Spotted Deer...277

1. Head of a Bull Bison...236
2. Skull and Horns of Bison...238
3. I Plunged My Hunting Knife Into His Side...243
4. A Big Bull Bison staring at me...245
5. A Tall Shot...246
6. Not the pleasantest Moment of my Life...248
7. A dead Bull...248
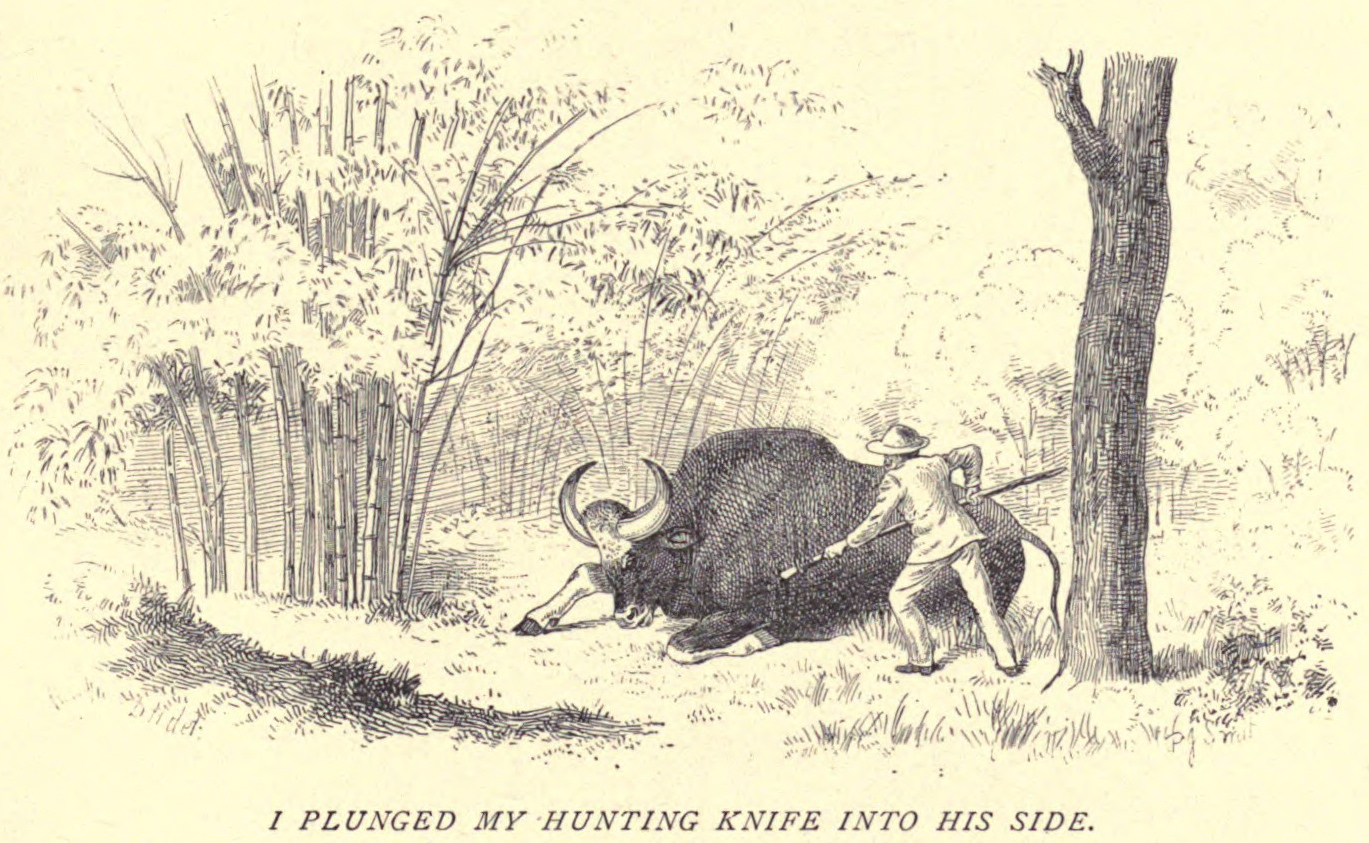
I Plunged My Hunting Knife Into His Side...243

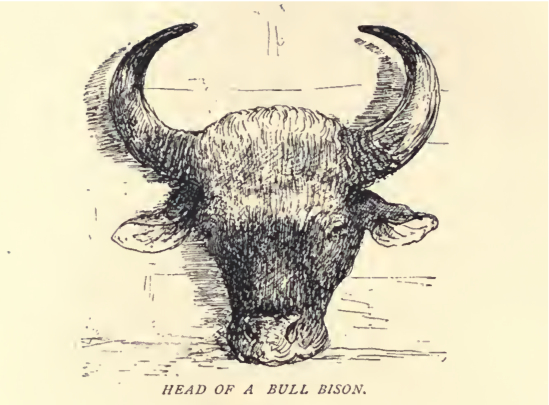
Head of bull bison...236

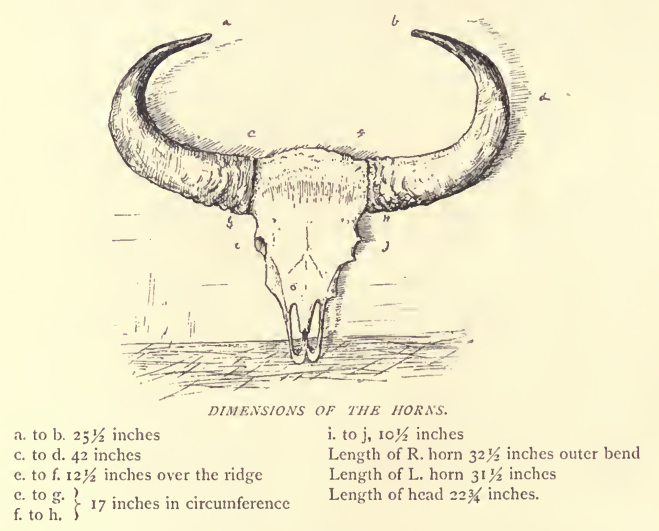
Dimensions of Bison horns...238

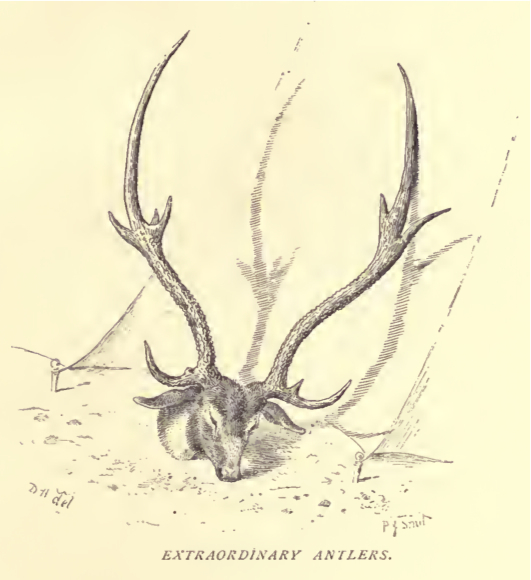
Axis deer, Trophy Antlers...279

CHAPTER X. -

1. The Sambur buck and doe...252
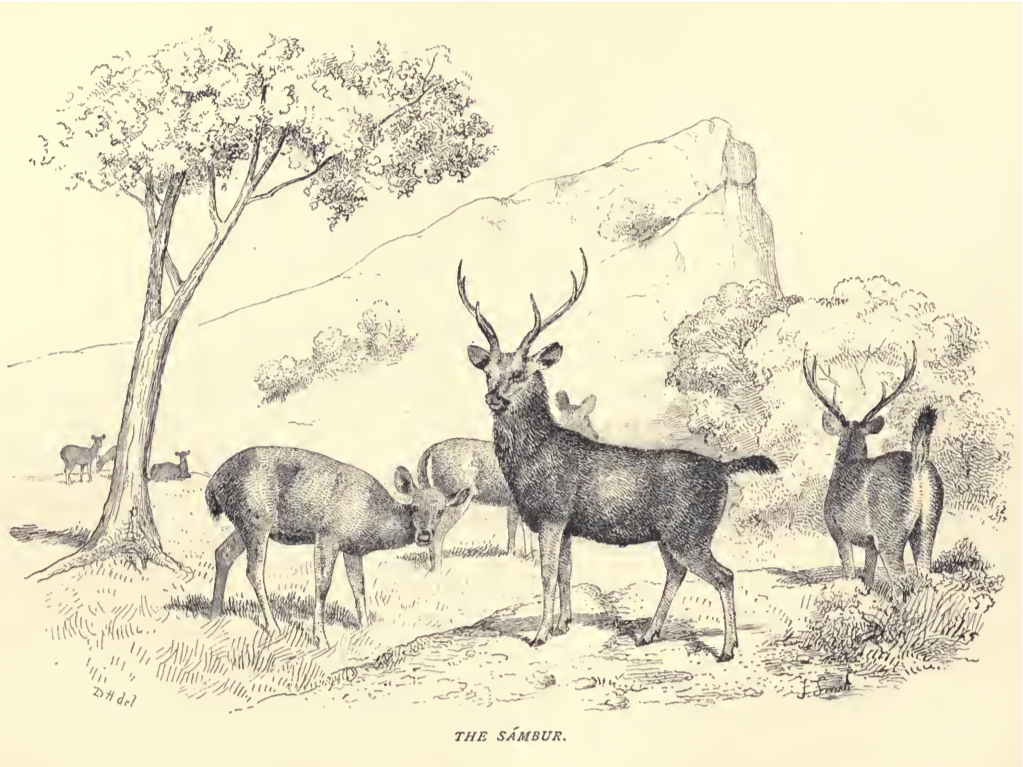
  Sambar Bucks and Does...252
2. Head and Horns of the big Antler Stag...258
3. The Unheeded Warning...262
4. His Last Leap...265
5. Puzzled...268
6. Snob and the Stag...269
7. "Now Bounding into the Air"...271
8. The Deer Stalker...278
9. The Axis or Spotted Deer...279
10. The Jungle Sheep...280

== Forests and Gardens of South India ==
In 1861, 13 plates and 17 figures of drawings by Douglas Hamiton were published in The Forests and Gardens of South India written by his friend and co-conservator Hugh Francis Cleghorn. Several of the drawings were lithographed by Mr. W. H. Macfarane, Edinburgh. Most of the drawings were technical illustrations of forestry operations, though some depicted landscapes of forested areas. These drawings are:

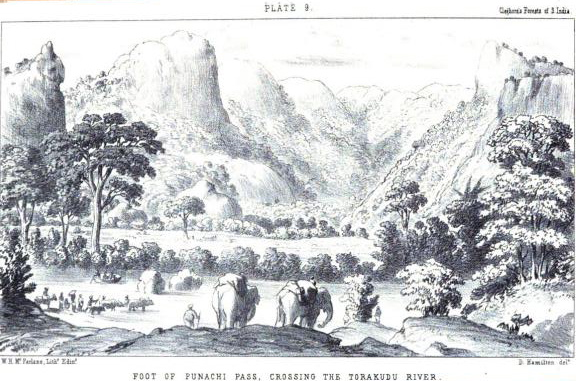
IX- Foot of the Poonachy Pass, Crossing the Torakudu River...290

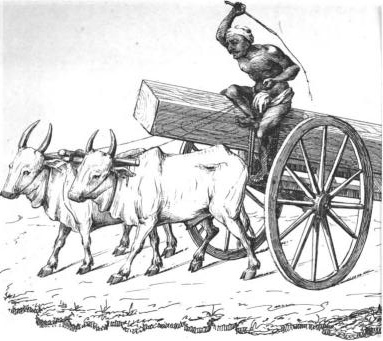
I- Usual way of loading a country cart...70

Plates
1. Forest Chart, facing title page.
2. I. The usual way of loading a country cart with a squared beam. . . .facing 70
3. II. Mischief caused by the carpenter-bees in a log of Chebulai...facing 71
4. III. Bamboo & The formation of a ghat in lieu of the rude timber slip. . . . facing 75
5. IV. Teak Tree. . . . facing 107
6. V. Teak. .. .facing 108
7. VI. Natives Carrying Fuel . . .facing 146
8. VII. Woman sitting . . .290
9. VIII. Panorama of mountain range from this village, showing the eastern aspect ('North Latitude 10' 27". East Longitude 77.') 10°27′N 77°0′E. . . facing 289
10. IX. Foot of the Poonachy Pass, Crossing the Torakudu River. . .290
11. X. Ancient Cromlech.. . 292
12. XI. gives a good outline of the Tangachi and Akka Mountains. . .292
13. XII. Rattan Chain for Collecting Honey (partial image) . . .facing 294
14. XIII. Gorge of the Toracodu River. . . 296

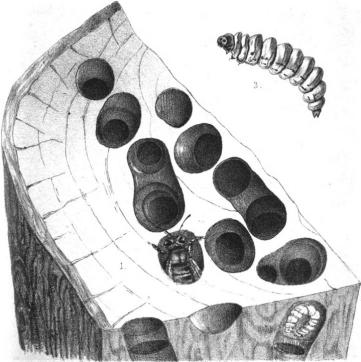
II- Mischief caused by Carpenter-bees...71

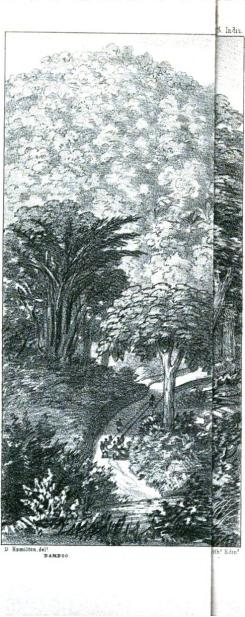
III- Bamboo & The Formation of a Ghat...75

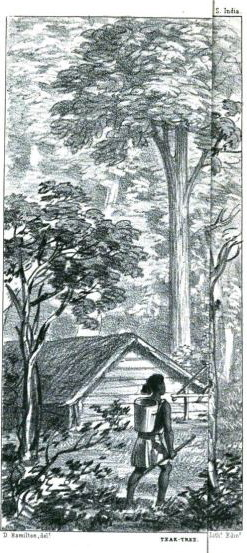
IV- Teak tree...107

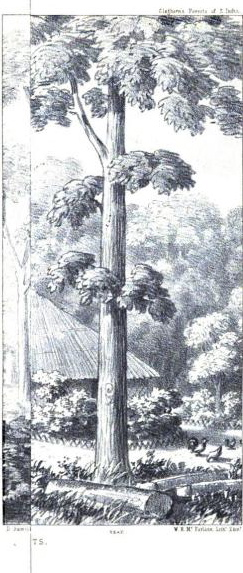
V- Teak tree...108

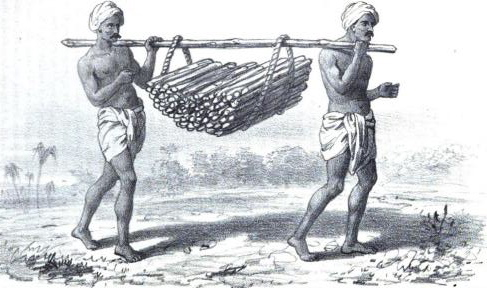
VI- Natives Carrying Fuel...146

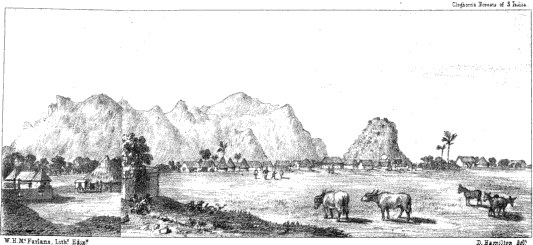
VIII- Panorama of mountain range from this village...289

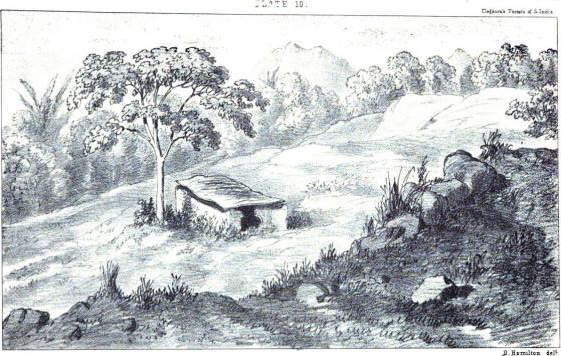
X. Ancient Cromlech. . . 292

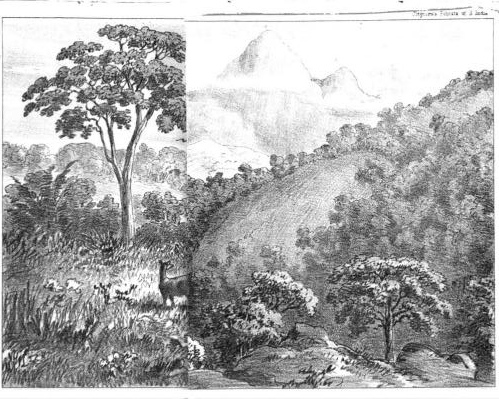
XI- Tangachi and Akka Mountains...292

Figures

fig. 3. Ferry Boat...41

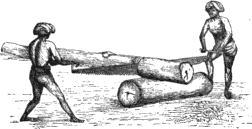
Fig. 6. Natives using the Saw...69

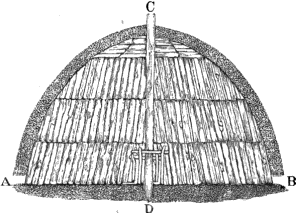
fig. 13. Vertical Section of Kiln...284

1. fig. 1. Drag holes in Log...3
2. fig. 2. 'V' shapes incisions in Kino tree...13
3. fig. 3. Ferry Boat...41
4. fig. 4. Showing Radial and Concentric Splits...65
5. fig. 5. Pile of Wood raised on Bricks...65
6. fig. 6. Natives using the Saw...69
7. fig. 7. Windward - Leeward...145
8. fig. 8. Tap Root...175
9. fig. 9. Avenue Trees Protected. From Du Breuil, Court d'Arboriculture, illustrates the manner in which avenue-trees are protected in the Boulevards of Paris....198
10. fig. 10. Forked Stick...283
11. fig. 11. stacked Billets...284
12. fig. 12. Section of one-half of the Kiln...284
13. fig. 13. Vertical Section of Kiln...284
14. fig. 14. Horizontal Section of Kiln...286
15. fig. 15, Kiln After Thirty-six Hours...286
16. fig. 16. Vertical Section of Charcoal Pit, with Vent Holes and Covering of Sod...287
17. fig. 17. Kiln Dug Out the Side of a Hill...288

== Self-portraits ==
Hamilton often portrayed himself in his drawings. He is shown at different times with mutton chop sideburns or a full beard. He is almost always shown holding his rifle and facing to the right. These self-portraits are cropped from drawings in Records of Sport...:

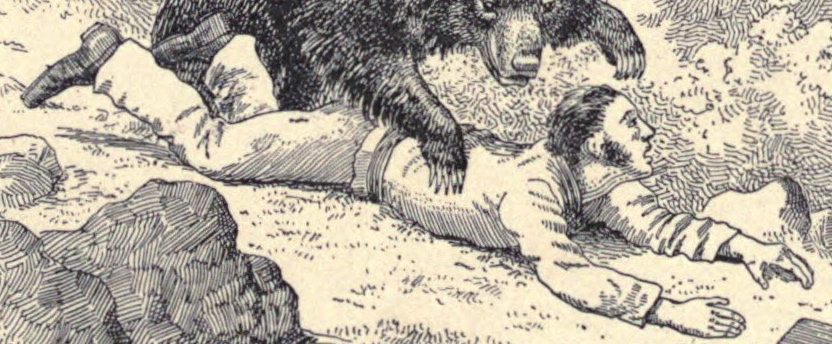
Douglas Hamilton, He was upon Me at Once, 1844

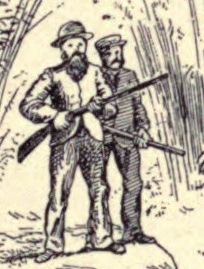
Douglas Hamilton, Heels over Head, 1856

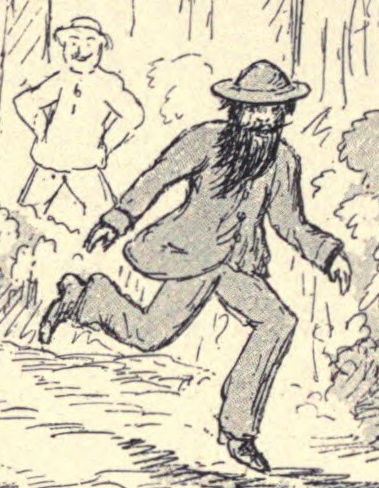
Douglas Hamilton, Tables Turned, 1856

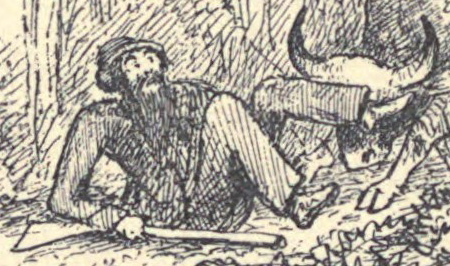
Douglas Hamilton, Attacked by bison, 1856

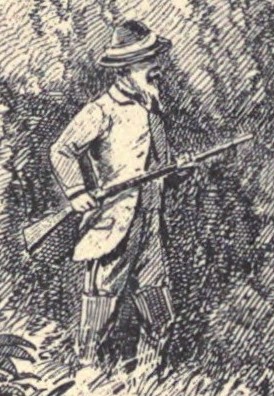
Douglas Hamilton at Killeyor, 1861

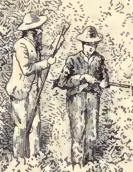
Douglas Hamilton with Sir Victor Brooke after Death of Tusker, 1863

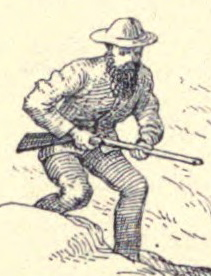
Douglas Hamilton, He stopped... 1867

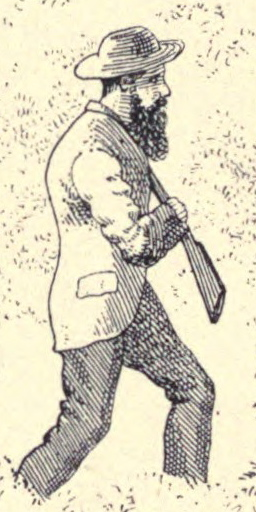
Douglas Hamilton, I Could Have Slapped His Face.
