= Albino gaur =

Type of gaur with distinctive ash-grey color, also known as white bison

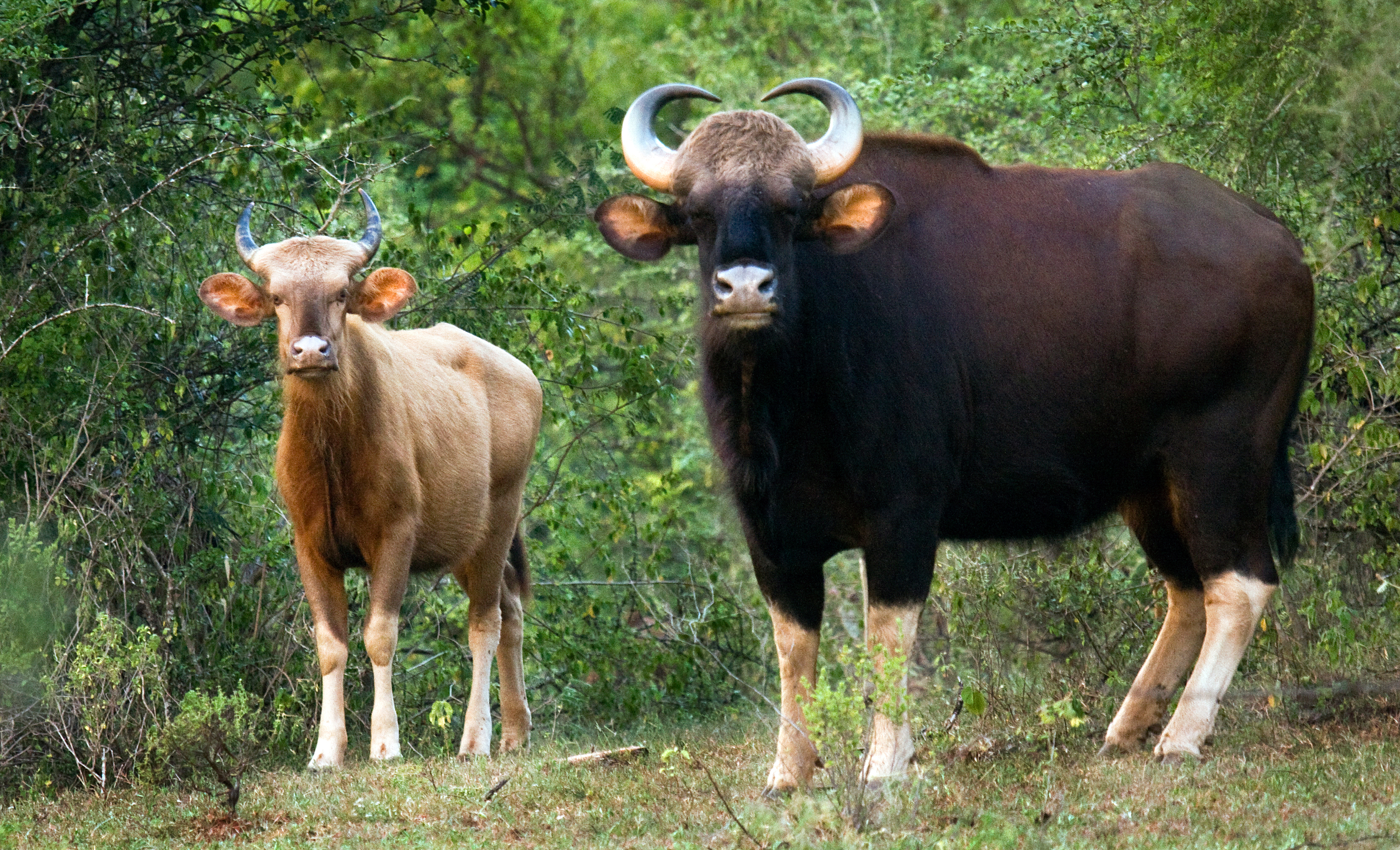
White bison at Chinnar Wildlife Sanctuary photographed by the wildlife photographer N. A. Naseer

Albino gaur or white bison are a type of gaur, occasionally seen in the Manjampatti Valley, a 110.9 km^{2} (42.8 sq mi) protected area at the eastern end of Indira Gandhi Wildlife Sanctuary and National Park in Coimbatore District, Tamil Nadu, South India. They are occasionally called Manjampatti white bison (Tamil: காட்டேணி kaatteni, or kaattu maadu, meaning "forest cow"). These gaur are notable for their distinctive ash-grey color as opposed to the almost black color of most gaur. Since 1929, there have been at least 19 documented sightings of these rare animals, including the 2004 photographs of N. A. Naseer.

== Description ==
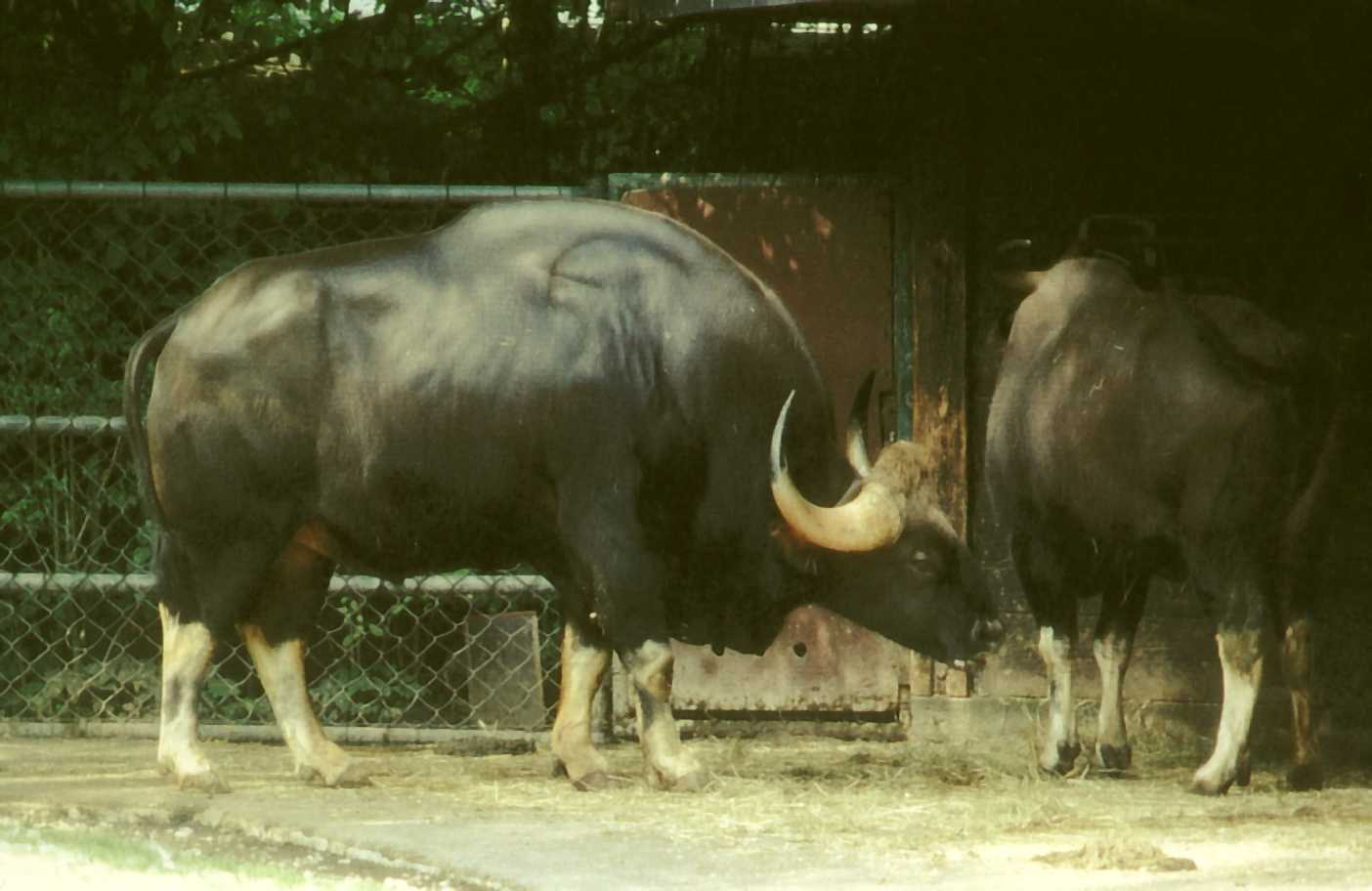
Normal colored gaur bull with typical high dorsal ridge

The gray-colored jungle bison is a peculiar subspecies of gaur (Bos gaurus gaurus). Many subspecies of gaur have been described, but only three subspecies are now recognized. Further research is required to precisely determine the taxonomy of this species.

Gaur were previously numerous all over the Palani Hills, but declined greatly during the 20th century. Now they are protected and their numbers are increasing substantially. The endangered gaur are the heaviest and most powerful of all wild bovines. Males have a highly muscular body, with a distinctive dorsal ridge, forming a very powerful appearance. Females are substantially smaller, and their dorsal ridge is less developed. Adult body length is 2.5 metres (8.2 ft) to 3.6 metres (12 ft) cm / 8.3–12 ft. Shoulder height is 170 centimetres (67 in) to 220 centimetres (87 in). Average males stand about 180 centimetres (71 in) to 190 centimetres (75 in) at the shoulder. Females are about 20 centimetres (7.9 in) less. Tail length is 70 centimetres (28 in) to 100 centimetres (39 in).

The male Indian gaurs' average weight is 1,300 kilograms (2,900 lb). Large individuals may exceed 1,700 kilograms (3,700 lb). Gaurs in Northern India are smaller than the southern breed, and more of the larger, better specimens can be seen in South India, due to the high concentration of gaur there. Calf and juvenile gaurs have several predators, including tigers; Asian black bears

== Historic references ==
There are several herds of gaur (popularly called bison) in Manjampatti Valley. Earlier, the area was well known for many Manjampatti white bison sightings. Only the Manjampatti valley of Udumalpet range is said to harbour white bison, a very rare animal.

Between 1929 and 1937, James L. H. Williams, a British wildlife enthusiast, reported sighting many gaur with light pink or white skin during many trips to Manjampatty Valley. He reported seeing many herds of gaur, with up to 13,120 animals in a herd. Most herds had some individuals with color varying from light red through the duns to pure white. In one herd of 20 animals, every animal was of abnormal color. He reported the white bison had some religious significance to the local Pulayar tribal residents, and they would gently divert outsiders away from any herds with abnormally colored animals.

Before 1939, a Mr. Ranicar shot a white bison in the Talinji area of Manjampatti Valley. J. C. Gouldsbury reported that Ranicar presented the mounted specimen of his cow white bison to the High Range Club in Munnar, where it was subsequently displayed. The pelage was originally almost cream-colored.

The 1939 Madras Forest Department – Administration Report mentions "white" bison in the Manjampatti Valley,

Before 1970, Mr. M. A. S. M. Muthuswamy walked the Munnar-Udumalpet road (SH 17) frequently. He reported seeing a herd of four white bison, which he described as greenish-grey in color, on several occasions in previous years. In 1969, he also saw a fine greenish-grey bull in a herd of normal-colored gaur at Kamanuthu, just off the SH 17 road in the Kombu beat on the Tamil Nadu side of the border. His brother, Mr Padmanabhan, said he had seen a herd of five there also.

In 1969, an ash-colored bull was seen by a dhobi from Amaravathinagar, who said he saw it while collecting firewood at Kamanuthu. In 1965, Mr. A. J. Packianathan, senior master of the Sainik School, Amaravathinagar, saw four ash-colored gaur in the same area.

In January 1969, Koolayan, a cattleman of the Malasar Tribe, who keeps cattle at Kumulam overlooking the northern slopes of Manjamalai and part of the northern slopes of Mudian Malai, saw one grey-colored gaur, the only one among the many gaur he has ever seen.

In 1970, Rajagopala Tondaiman, the Raja of Pudukottai, saw one white bull gaur beyond Kukal in Koilan Alai, and he has seen about half a dozen of them in the past 30 years among herds of normal colored gaur.

An ancient Sinhala Kavi verse reads in part: "Having come swiftly, On the day the excellent white gaur was killed, A scoop of blood was given to thee ! ..."

In 1970, E. R. C. Davidar, a famous wildlife researcher, spent several months on behalf of the Bombay Natural History Society in Chinnar trying to spot and photograph this animal. His mission, undertaken to provide scientific evidence to the rumours floating in the air for several decades, did not find success. His report to the BNHS, White Bison of Manjampatti said the white gaur reported by Williams might have become extinct following the outbreak of an epizootic disease that wiped out several herds from the region in those days. But, tribals living in the forests continued to claim white gaurs were still there in Chinnar.

In 1972, Rev. Sam Schmitthenner observed two white gaur in Manjampatti Valley. He said:

I took one more hike down into Manjampatti after staying in Kukkal Cave overnight. Early in the morning, we saw a herd of bison, and there on the edge of the herd were two albino calves. Earlier that month I had read an article in Hornbill, a Bombay conservation magazine, about the albino bison of Manjamphatti.

About 1975, two local guides guiding some Europeans hoping to see the white bison said they had not seen a 'white bison' in the last 15 or 20 years. They admitted quite frankly this was partly because there was no occasion for them to go looking for gaur.

== Recent sightings ==
In January or February, 2011, Minoo Avari, Sunder Shaker, who was then the Manager at the Kodaikanal Golf Club and at least two caddies saw a beautiful white bison cow on the golf course at about 2 or 2:30 in the afternoon. They were on the tee box and the bison was on the 14th green. The players were warned by their caddies that she was skittish and liable to charge if they went too close. That is not usually a problem with other bison often seen on the course. The golf caddies said they see this white bison from time to time.

During the 2008 annual wildlife census in the Amaravati range in the Indira Gandhi Wildlife Sanctuary, bison were seen in Thanlinji village, Manjampatti and Mungilpallam and reportedly there was also a white (albino) bison.

On 29 December 2007, C. R. Jayaprakash made a clear photograph of a white gaur resting near Masingudi on the Sigur Plateau. This is considerably out of the normal range of the animal in the Annamalai Hills.

A 2007 encounter with a white bison at the jungle lodge near the Chinnar checkpost has been described:

A white bison reaches the end of the trail and stops at the edge of the clearing. He's huge. Over 1.8 metres (5.9 ft) tall and 2.4 metres (7.9 ft) to 3 metres (9.8 ft) long. Sharp horns over 30 centimetres (12 in) long. I have nowhere to go because the bison herd has blocked the other two exits, so I'm just standing there, hoping white bison will keep walking and I can go back onto the trail. No such luck. He stands there, barely ten feet away from me, and stares. And stares. I'm thinking, wow, I'm totally going to die right now, because I've got white bison in front of me and brown bison to my left, and neither of them like me here... So for about five full minutes we face off, until white bison decides the water is more important, and finally meanders off.

In 2007, a rare Manjampatti white bison was seen by George Roshan in a herd of about eight or 10 normal-coloured bison grazing and resting on mountain downs above Kukkal at the northeast corner of Manjampatti Valley.

In 2006, this possible subspecies was seen and photographed in Manjampatti Valley by Forest Department staff.

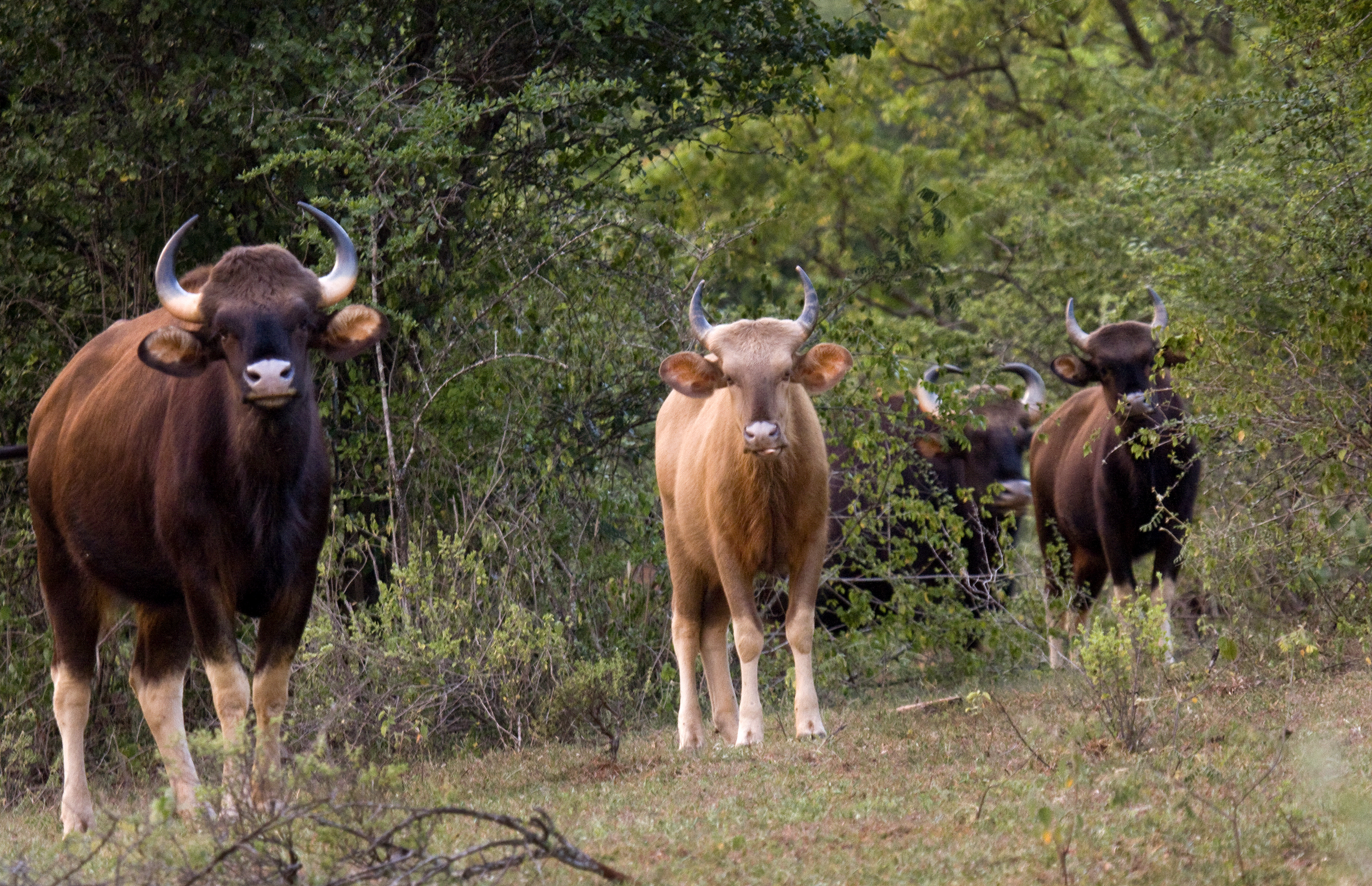
The white bison photographed by N. A. Naseer.

In 2004, the famous and extremely rare white bison was reported at Chinnar. In July 2004, an unusual white gaur, moving with a herd of dark-skinned gaur, was spotted repeatedly over several days in the Chinnar Wildlife Sanctuary and photographed by the wildlife photographer, N. A. Naseer. This is the only published photographic documentation of Manjampatti white bison.

In 1998, the then Wildlife Warden of Eravikulam, Mohan Alambath, his Range Officer, V. K. Franzis, and a wildlife enthusiast, V. P. Ajithkumar, claimed sighting this animal in Chinnar. Though they reported the matter in the journal of BNHS the photograph they had taken of the animal lacked clarity.

On 21 October 1997, two grayish-white gaur, an adult female and a subadult, were observed along with 9 other gaur on the slopes of Cheevaparamala in the Chinnar Wildlife Sanctuary. On 3 January 1998, a juvenile with the same color was seen at Koottar along with five others. In addition to the white gaur, the majority of the animals in these herds ranged from brick red to light red. In the first herd of 11, there were only four normal-colored gaur, and in the second herd of six, only two normal-colored individuals. This was the first record of white bison in the Chinnar Sanctuary, which shares a long common border with the Manjampatti Valley.

In 1997 in Satpura, four totally white gaur were reported – presumably albinos or some genetic sport, which, amid their black companions, appear like ghosts in a forest. In 1980, sightings of a herd of white gaur were reported from Bandhar near Munnar.

== Other references ==
- Video 6:31 Tigers hunt Largest Wild Cattle Gaurs
- Brander, A.A.Dunbar, (1936) White Bison, Journal of the Bombay Natural History Society. 38(3): 619-620.
- Whitaker, Romulus. White Gaur of Manjampatti, Hornbill, Bombay, April–June 1979, 30.
- பேச்சு:கடமா
