= Vagavurrai =

- village
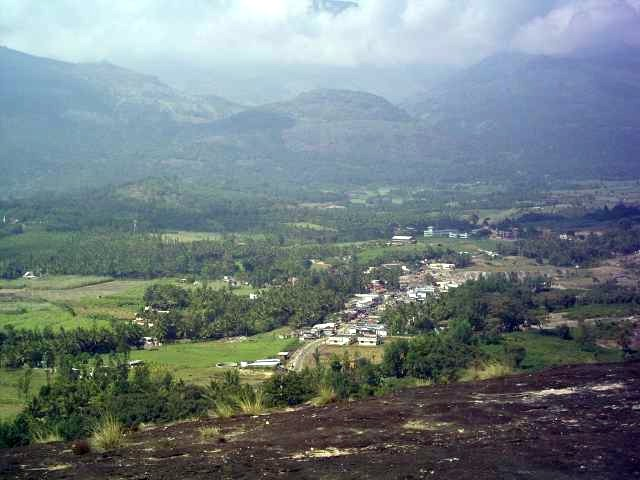

- Location in Kerala, India Vagavurrai (India)
- Coordinates: 10.1779°N 77.1068°E
- Country: India
- State: Kerala
- District: Idukki

Languages
  - Official: Malayalam, English,
- Time zone: UTC+5:30 (IST)
- Postal code: 685614
- Telephone code: 91 – 4865
- ISO 3166 code: IN-KL
- Vehicle registration: KL
- Website: kdhptea.com/vagavurrai.html

Vagavurrai or Vaguvarrai is a village in Idukki district of Kerala, India. It is located 24 kilometers north of Munnar and 18 kilometer from Marayur on SH 17 connecting Munnar with Udumalpet, Tamil Nadu.

== Etymology ==
Vagavurrai got its name from the vagaa flower (commonly known as the malaria flower).

== Geography ==
Geographically, Vagavurrai is located approximately 25 km from Munnar, and is flanked by the Madupatty Dam on one side, and the highest peak of South India, Aneimudi, on the other side.

Access to Vagavurrai is provided by 9th mile Udumalpet road, and also by Munnar Top Station road. This entire area has a wealth of flora and fauna. Rare rhododendrons are found in parts of Vaguvurrai and Gundumallay, as do the much sought-after kurinji in Vagavurrai. It is also known for its rich wildlife, including elephants, bison, mouse deer, sambar and porcupines.
