= Thirumoorthy Dam =

Dam in Tamil Nadu, India

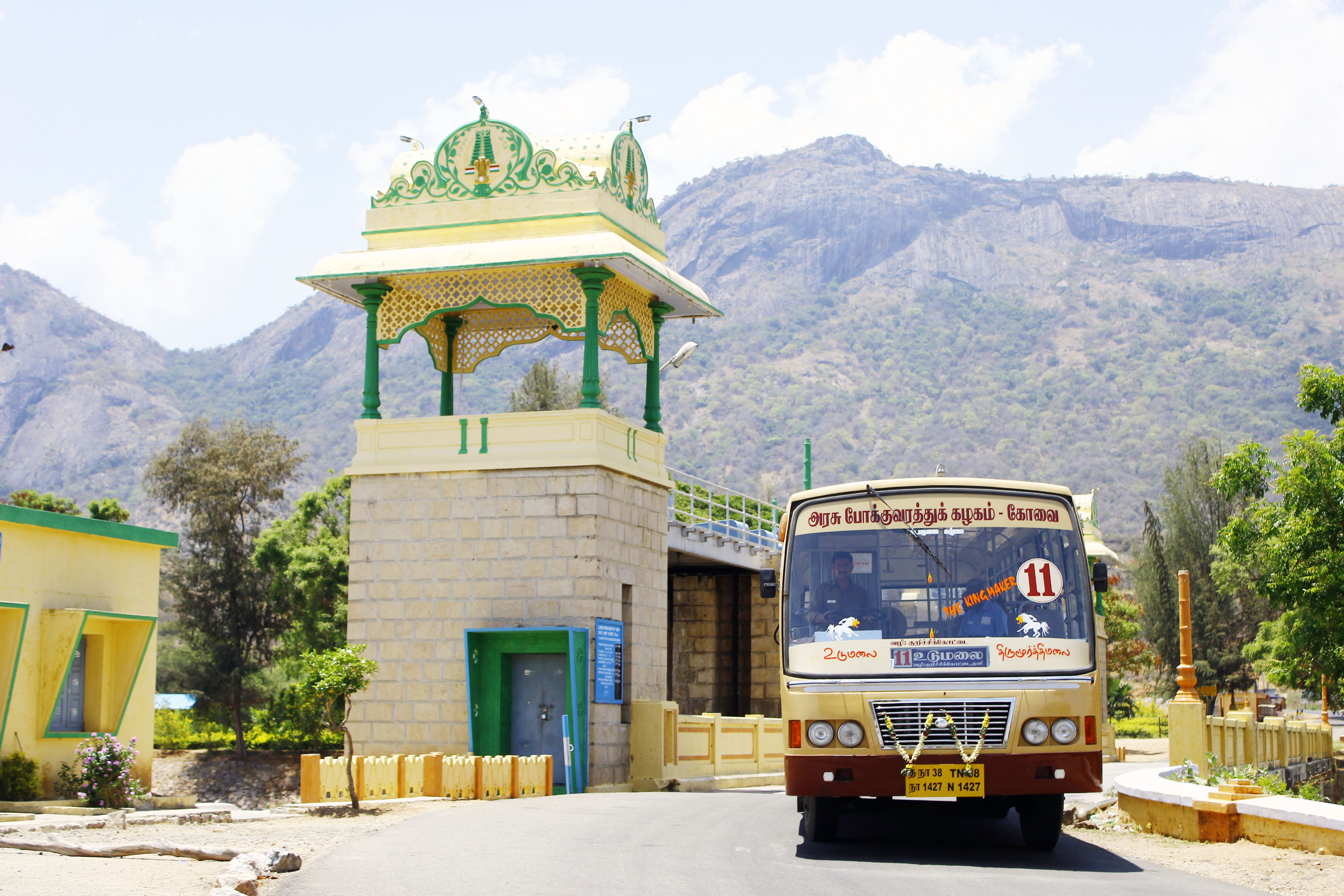
- Thirumoorthy Dam Reservoir

- Location within India
- Coordinates: 10.485°N 77.154°E

Thirumoorthy Dam is a masonry gravity dam located at Thirumoorthy hills in Udumalaipettai, Tamil Nadu.
