= Mazhani Amman Temple =

Mazhani Amman Temple is a Hindu temple dedicated to the goddess Mazhani Amman. It is situated on the Pollachi-Topslip highway. Mazhani Amman is the Hindu goddess of revenge and devotees throng the temple and pray to her for revenge against their enemies. Devotees also grind red chillies into powder in order to appease the goddess.
