= Koukal =

Origin
- Languages: Czech and Slovak
- Region of origin: Czech Republic

Other names
- Variant form: Kukal

Koukal (Czech pronunciation: [ˈkoukal]) is a Czech masculine surname. The feminine form is Koukalová.

It may refer to:

- František Koukal (born 1949), Czech fencer
- Jan Koukal (born 1951), Czech politician
- Jan Koukal (squash player) (born 1983), Czech squash player
- Martin Koukal (born 1978), Czech cross-country skier
- Zdeněk Koukal (born 1984), Czech footballer
- Gabriela Koukalová (née Soukalová) (born 1989), Czech biathlete
- Klára Koukalová (born 1982), Czech tennis player
