= Amaravathinagar =

- Town
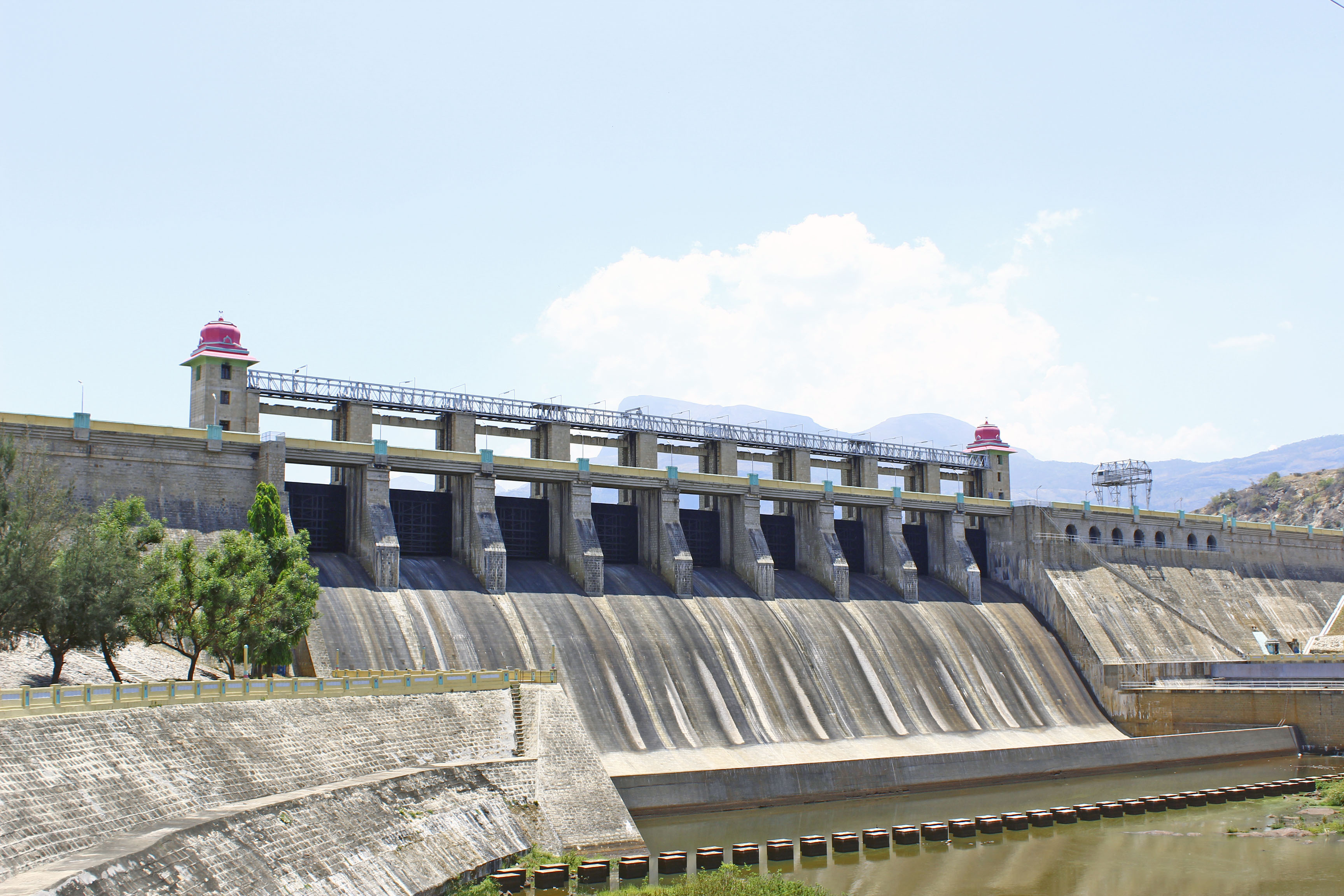
- Amaravathi Dam at Amaravathinagar

- Location in Tamil Nadu, India Amaravathinagar (India)
- Coordinates: 10.425436°N 77.264614°E
- Country: India
- State: Tamil Nadu
- District: Tirupur
- Elevation: 305 m (1,001 ft)

Languages
  - Official: Tamil
- Time zone: UTC+5:30 (IST)
- PIN: 642 102
- Vehicle registration: TN-78

Amaravathinagar is a small town in the foothills of Annamalai Hills in Tirupur district, Tamil Nadu, India; 17 km south on SH 17 from Udumalpet and around 80 km south of Downtown Coimbatore city. The three major employers in this village are the Amaravathi Reservoir and dam, Sainik School and the Glucose Factory.

== Places of Interest ==
This place is in valley in the Western Ghats of south India. There are many hills around Amaravathinagar and Idilimalai is one among them.

Thoovanam falls is one of the four trekking routes nearby in the Amaravathy range of the Indira Gandhi Wildlife Sanctuary and National Park.

Amaravathi Amman temple yearly once this temple will be decorated and celebration will be there for 14 days in this village. people from near by villages and even from coimbatore, madurai will be coming for festival.
