= Sainik School, Amaravathinagar =

- Amaravathinagar, Tamil Nadu; India

Information
- Type: Sainik School
- Motto: Can Do It
- Established: 16 July 1962; 64 years ago
- School board: CBSE
- Principal: Capt (IN) Rahul Thiyyath
- Faculty: 50
- Gender: Boys and Girls
- Average class size: 35-40
- Language: English
- Houses: Chera, Chola, Pandya, Pallava
- Color: Grey And Red
- Alumni: Amaravians (Amaravian Alumni Association)
- Cadets: 703
- Website: www.sainikschoolamaravathinagar.edu.in

Sainik School Amaravathinagar is a Boys and Girls English medium, residential public school with a military bias up to +2 stage as per the CBSE board Syllabus. It is one of the 33 Government aided Sainik Schools in India, located in Udumalpet, Tiruppur district of Tamil Nadu.

== History ==
Sainik School, Amaravathi Nagar, was started on 16 July 1962 as part of the Sainik School society. It was called Sainik School, Madras (SSM) until 1975. Sainik School, Amaravathinagar, was formed with the objective of training cadets to join the National Defence Academy - NDA (NDA provides combined training for the cadets entering into all the three forces in India). Indian naval academy (INA) which provides training for the naval cadets entering into the Indian Navy.

Students are selected through an entrance examination (All India Sainik Schools Entrance Exam - AISSEE, written exam followed by a medical test) for the entry into 6th and 9th standard and the selected candidates are given public school education. The cadets with leadership skills are trained to become officers in the Army, Navy and Air Force. Only Indian citizens are eligible for entry into the school.

== Aim ==
The aim of the school is to prepare the boys and girls academically, physically and psychologically for entry into the National Defence Academy or other walks of life.

== School colors and crest ==
The school colors are steel grey and blood red. Grey stands for strength and red for devotion to duty and comradeship. In the school crest, the swords represents valour and the lamp stands for knowledge and wisdom. The gopuram symbolises the culture and genius of Tamil Nadu.

== Campus ==
The school campus occupies 199 acres (0.81 km^{2}) in the Indira Gandhi National Park's valley. Surrounded by mountains on all sides the campus is seen against the backdrop of the Amaravathi Dam

== Academics ==
The education in the school follows [Central Board of Secondary Education] pattern and the examinations provided by this system.

== Athletics and extracurriculars ==
Football, hockey, volleyball, basketball, cricket, athletics, cross-country running, swimming, gymnastics, canoeing, cycling, horse riding, mountaineering, parasailing, trekking (hiking), obstacles course, rifle shooting, boxing, NCC, karate, music clubs, literary clubs, theater arts, elocution, photography, fine arts, craftwork, philately, aero-modeling, ship-modeling, Marching band, Choir

=== Culture and social life ===
- Present day students and the alumni call themselves Amaravians.
- Houses / dormitory:
  - Chera - blue - Bow and Arrow
  - Chola - red - Tiger
  - Pandya - yellow - Golden Fish
  - Pallava - green - Lion
- Feeder Houses (only for Class 6)
  - Valluvar - all the students of Pandya and Pallava houses are admitted into Valluvar house in 6th Std.
  - Bharathi - all the students of Chera and Chola houses are admitted into Bharathi house in 6th Std.
- Students from 6th std will be in either housed in Valluvar or Bharathi houses based on their houses. Students are divided into four houses namely Chera, Chola, Pandya and Pallava from 6th Std onwards. 7th std to 9th std Students are in respective junior houses and 10th std to 12th std students are in respective senior houses.
- School badge: SSA
- Uniform: khaki white and grey, Black and White, White and White
- School day celebration is celebrated over two days every year in January.
- Students have three vacations every year. Diwali Vacation is decided upon the day when the festival occurs. Summer vacation are from the 1st week of April until last week of May. Pongal Break is on the 3rd week of January month.
- Inter house competitions are held throughout the year. Each house gets points based on their performance. The house which gets most points at the end of the year will be winner of the year.
- The school has a cinema hall called 'Sahni' named after the first principal of the school.
- The school has a library and reading room with magazines and periodicals.
- The school has also the privilege of producing national level athletes like Vigneshwaran M, P Thomas, Danish Esaw and many more legends.

== School information ==
- Joining NDA is an ambition for most of the students.
- NDA selection is done in two stages by a single competitive examination for all the three forces followed by an interview conducted by the Services Selection Board
- An entrance examination is conducted to select students which is open for students from across the country.

== Faculty ==
The average education of the faculty teacher is Master's degree in their disciplines and Master of Education. The faculty and staff help in the extra/co-curricular activities of the school. Senior master is Maths master Mr. S. Paulraj. All the staff and faculty live within the school campus or in Amaravathinagar.

- Mr P. Chandiran (Chemistry Master) and Mr A. Soundararajan (Asst. Master in Biology) were awarded the best teacher award by the President of India in the year 2011 and 2013, respectively.

The school academic campus has a Harvard/Texan T-6 warbird preserved for display.

- Faculty and staff children (boys and girls) are admitted as day scholars.

== Amar Sainik ==
Amar Sainik School came into being in 1985 to help the Sainik staff children and to help the nearby village people. It started with 50 children. The strength of the school is about 250 children (200 boys and 50 girls).

== See also ==
- Indian Naval Academy
- Air force academy
- Officers Training Academy
- Indian Military Academy
