= State Highway 17 (Kerala) =

Road in Kerala, India

State Highway 17
- Northern outlet road
- SH 17 highlighted in red

Route information
- Maintained by Kerala Public Works Department
- Length: 59.1 km (36.7 mi)

Major junctions
- South end: NH 85 in Munnar
- North end: MDR 509 at TN border in Chinnar

Location
- Country: India
- State: Kerala
- Districts: Idukki

Highway system
- Roads in India; Expressways; National; State; Asian; State Highways in Kerala
← SH 16	→ SH 18

Kerala State Highway 17, also called the Northern outlet road and Munnar - Udumalpet road, is notable for passing between the Anaimalai Hills and the Palani Hills, through or near three important protected areas and providing opportunities for viewing wildlife in unspoiled forests.
The total road length is about 59.1 km (36.7 mi).

== Route ==
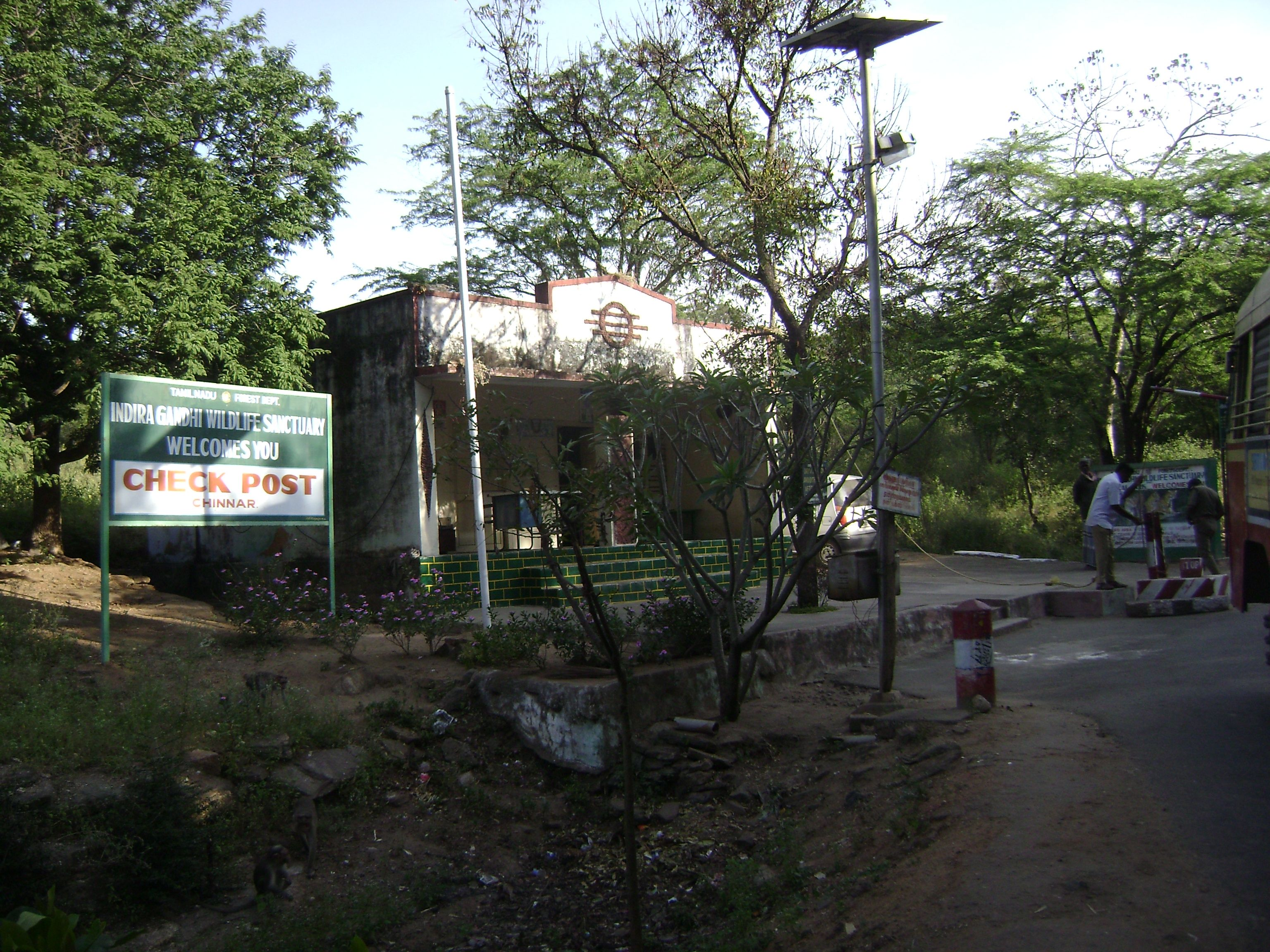
SH 17 Tamil Nadu border checkpost

SH 17 starts north from NH 49 (Aluva - Munnar Highway) at Munnar, running about 2 km alongside the Kannimala River, then to Rajamudi village - Anakkalpetty road and on to Eravikulam village. It passes near Eravikulam National Park and Anamudi, the tallest Indian peak south of the Himalayas and into Marayoor town, (km 42). It then passes through the centre of Chinnar Wildlife Sanctuary, past Chinnar Watchtower and continues to Chinnar Check post, (km 59). It crosses the state boundary on a highway bridge over the Chinnar River at 10.35241°N 77.21775°E.

It enters Indira Gandhi Wildlife Sanctuary and National Park at Tamil Nadu check post and continues past Manjampatti Watchtower along the bottom of Manjampatti Valley. It passes through the park around Amaravathi Reservoir and Amaravathi Dam to exit the park at the Forest Department checkpost (km 71) near Amaravathinagar and the Sainik School, Amaravathinagar. It goes down onto the plains through Manupatti (km 75), Kurichkotti, through a large area of wind turbines, Pallapalyam, extensive agricultural fields, Bodipatti, across Southern Railway - Salem Division tracks in Kanakkampalayam, and on to NH 209 at Udumalpet (km 85) in Tamil Nadu, South India.

== Gallery ==
The south end of SH 17 and the intersection of NH 85. SH 17 on the left.

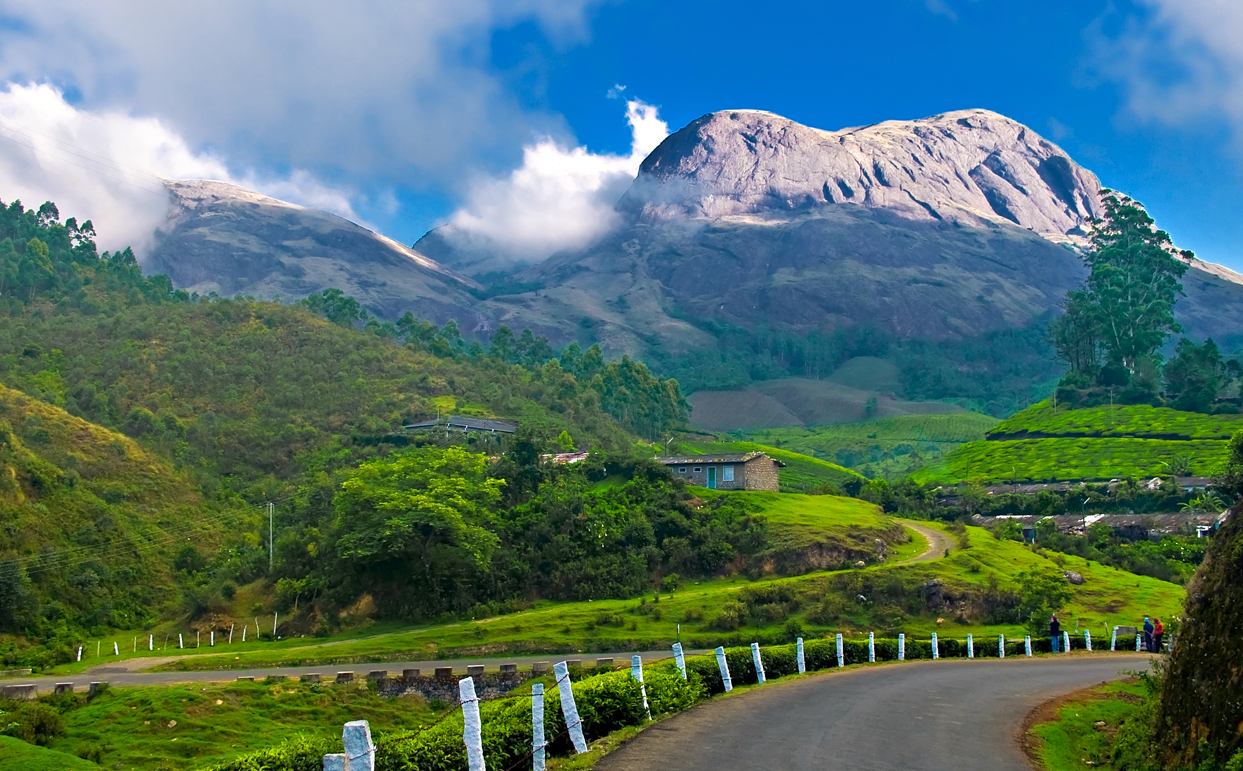
SH 17 with Anamudi

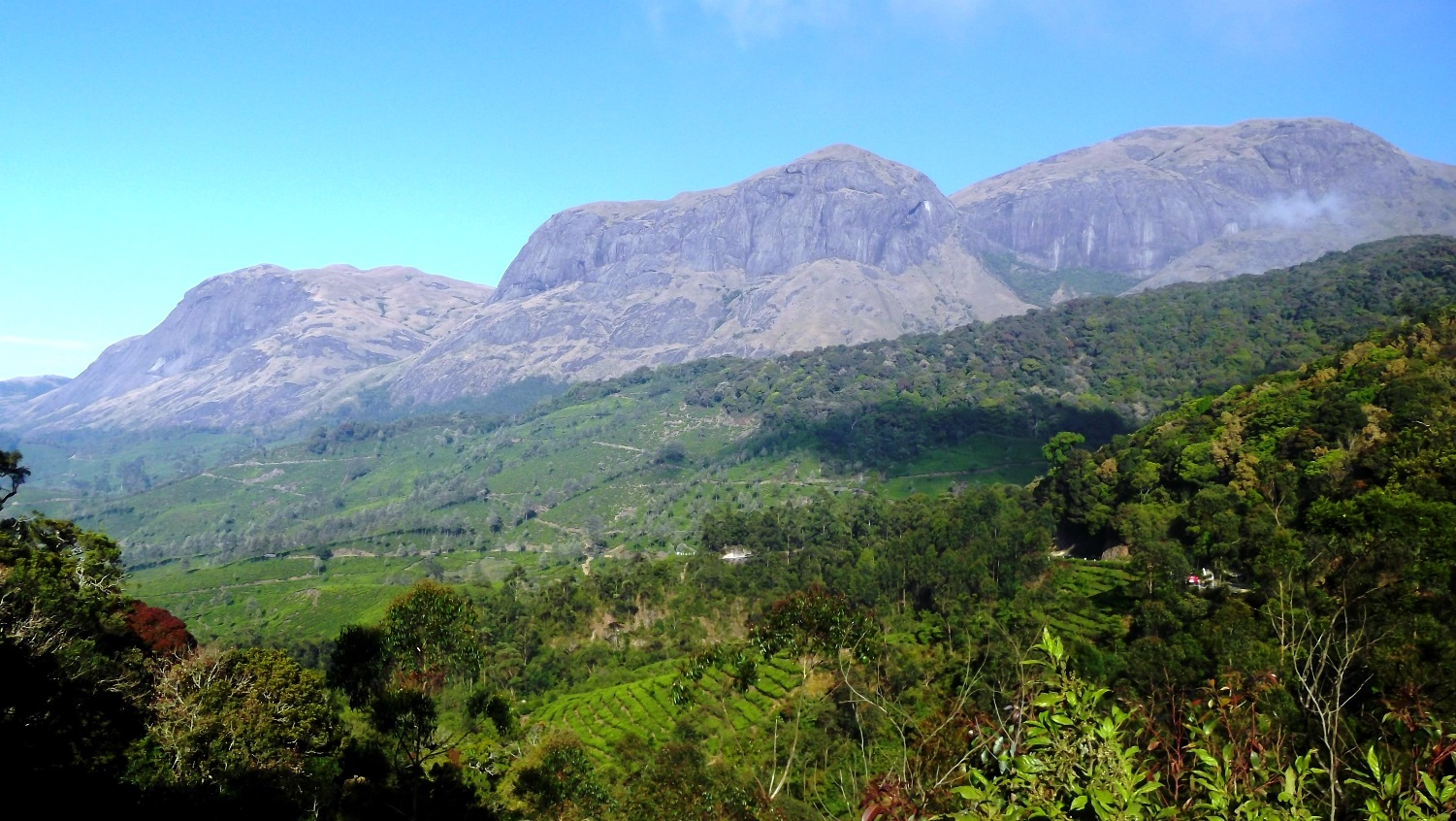
Anamudi as seen from SH 17

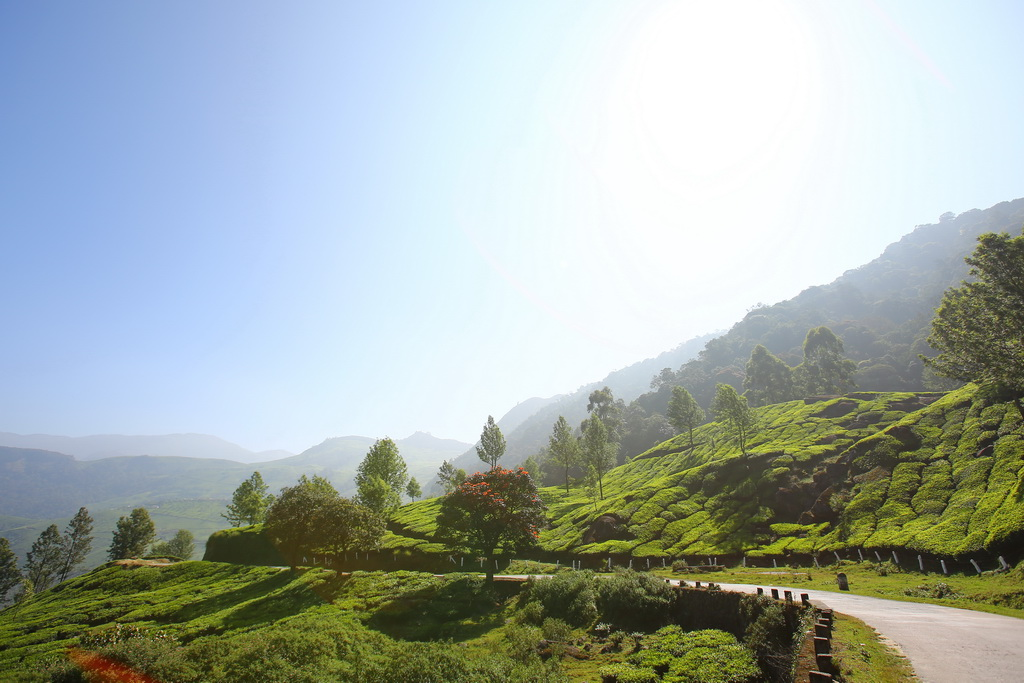
SH 17 in the Kannan Devan Hills
