= Nugu Wildlife Sanctuary =

Coordinates: 11°55′50″N 76°27′20″E

- IUCN category IV (habitat/species management area)
- Interactive map of Nugu Wildlife Sanctuary
- Location: Mysuru district, Karnataka, India

Nugu Wildlife Sanctuary is situated north of Bandipur National Park in Mysore District of Karnataka, India. The northern part of Nugu WLS is occupied by the Nugu Reservoir. It serves as a home to many species of flora and fauna such as Dipterocarpus indicus, Calophyllum tomentosum, elephants, wild pigs, spotted deer, leopards, jungle cats, etc. This wildlife sanctuary serves as a great tourist attraction, especially in the months of October to April.

According to animal activists, Nugu is a vulnerable area as far as human–elephant conflicts are concerned.

== Location ==
Nugu WLS's elevation ranges from 719 to 790 metres (2,359 to 2,592 ft). Nugu Wildlife Sanctuary also receives an annual rainfall amounting to 856 millimetres (33.7 in). The wildlife sanctuary is also surrounded by Nugu Dam, two seasonal lakes, and three water tanks to provide water resources in the sanctuary.

== Eco-sensitive zone ==
Nugu Wildlife Sanctuary has been declared as an eco-sensitive zone by the Ministry of Environment, Forests and Climate Change, because of the number of commercial tourism ventures in the sanctuary. This was also done in order to emphasize the density of elephant populations and to conserve them.
