= Amaravathi Dam =

Dam on the Amaravathi River in India

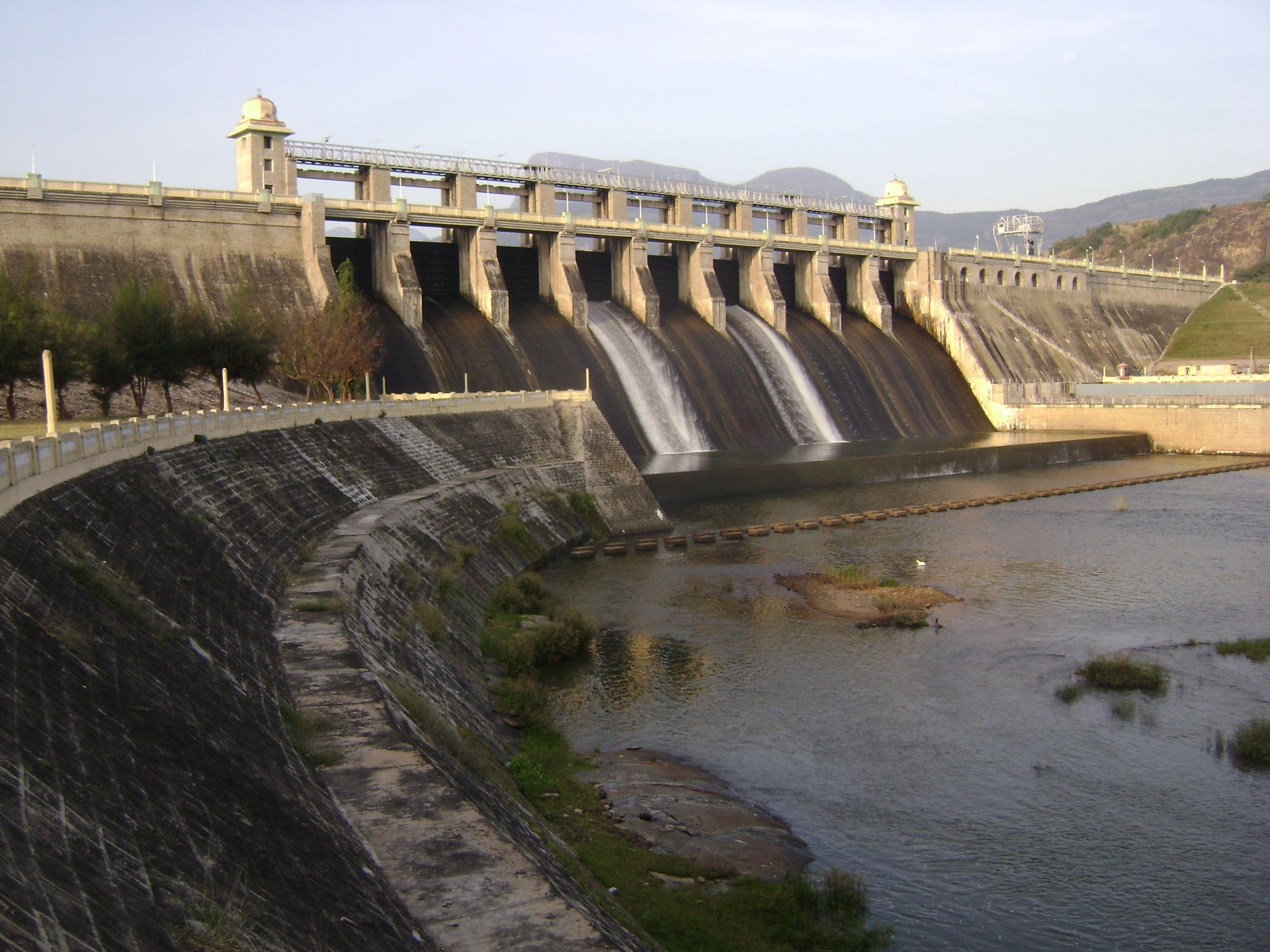

- Location within Tamil Nadu
- Official name: Amaravathi Dam
- Location: Amaravathinagar in Indira Gandhi Wildlife Sanctuary, Udumalpet, Tirupur district, Tamil Nadu, India
- Coordinates: 10°24.64′N 77°15.6′E
- Opening date: 1957

Dam and spillways
- Impounds: Amaravati River

Reservoir
- Creates: Amaravathi Reservoir

The Amaravathi Dam is a dam constructed across the Amaravathi River. It is located at Amaravathinagar, 25 kilometres (16 mi) south of Udumalpet on SH 17 in the Indira Gandhi Wildlife Sanctuary, Tirupur district in the Indian state of Tamil Nadu. The associated Amaravathi Reservoir is 9.31 square kilometres (3.59 sq mi) in area and 33.53 metres (110.0 ft) deep. The dam was built primarily for irrigation and flood control and now also has four megawatts of electrical generating capacity installed. It is notable for the significant population of mugger crocodiles living in its reservoir and catchment basin.

== History ==
The dam was built across the Amaravati River in 1957, during K Kamaraj's administration, about 25 km upstream and south of the Thirumoorthy Dam.

In November 2024, the Tamil Nadu Water Resources Department issued a tender seeking a project management consultancy to prepare a detailed project report on desilting and deepening reservoirs across the state. A department official said Amaravati was among the reservoirs to be taken up, along with Mettur, Vaigai, and Pechipari.

== Tourism ==
There is a well laid-out park where one may climb steep steps on the dam to have a picturesque view north of the plains below and south to the Anaimalai Hills and Palni Hills above. Boating for tourists in the dam began on 14 January 2011.

== Amaravathi Reservoir ==
Amaravathi Reservoir
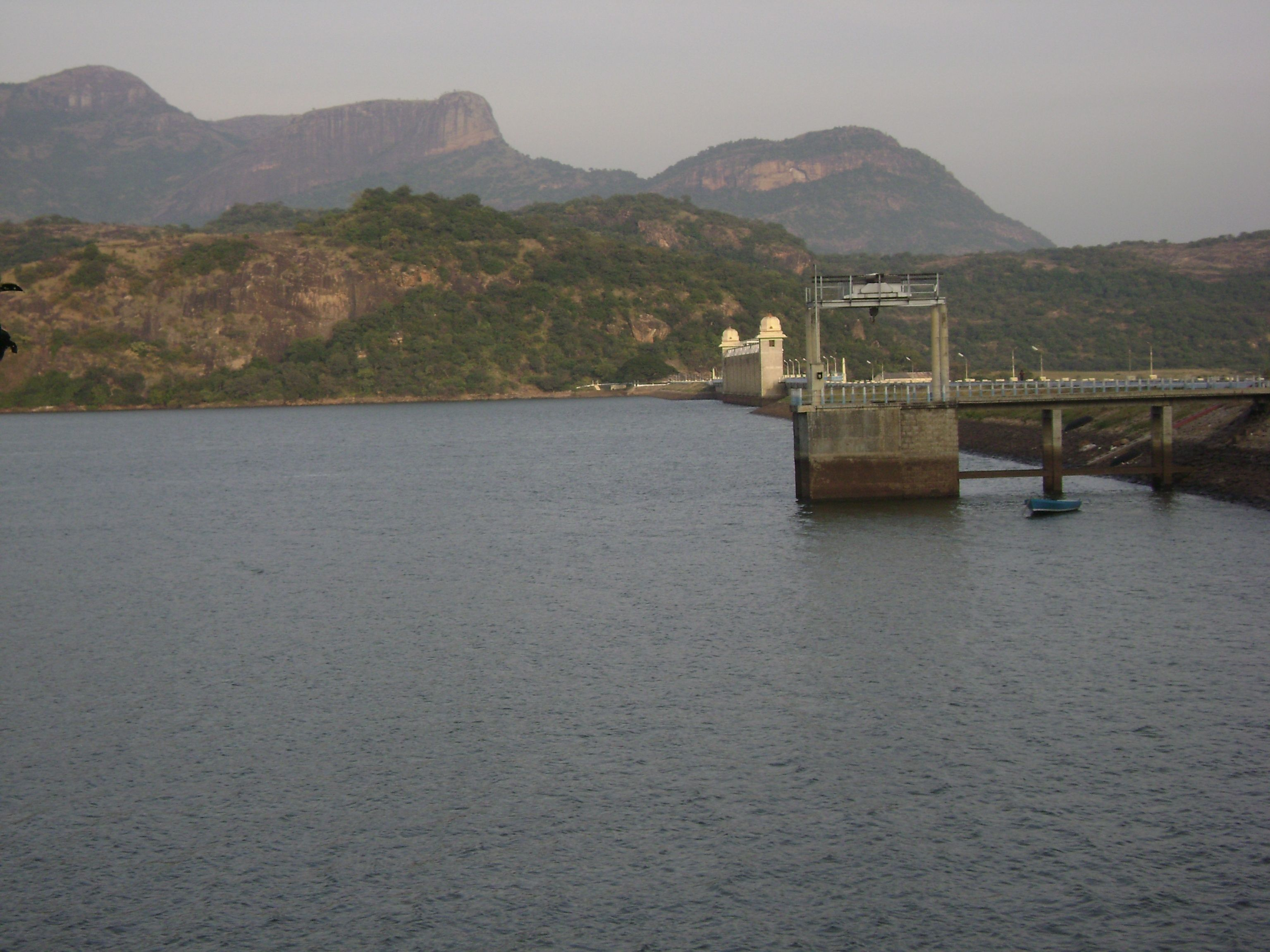
- Amaravathi Reservoir and Dam

- Location within Tamil Nadu
- Location: Indira Gandhi Wildlife Sanctuary and National Park, Tiruppur district, Tamil Nadu
- Coordinates: 10°24.64′N 77°15.6′E
- Type: reservoir
- Primary inflows: Pambar River → Chinnar River → Amaravathi River
- Primary outflows: Amaravathi River
- Basin countries: India
- Surface area: 9.31 km^{2} (3.59 sq mi)
- Max. depth: 33.53 m (110.0 ft)
- Water volume: 3×10^{9} cu ft (0.085 km^{3})
- Surface elevation: 427 m (1,401 ft)

Amaravathi Reservoir at Amaravathinagar, 25 km (16 mi) south on SH 17 from Udumalpet, is located in Indira Gandhi Wildlife Sanctuary and National Park in Tiruppur district, Tamil Nadu, India. The reservoir was created by the steep Amaravathi Dam built across the Amaravathi River.

== History of the Amaravathi reservoir ==
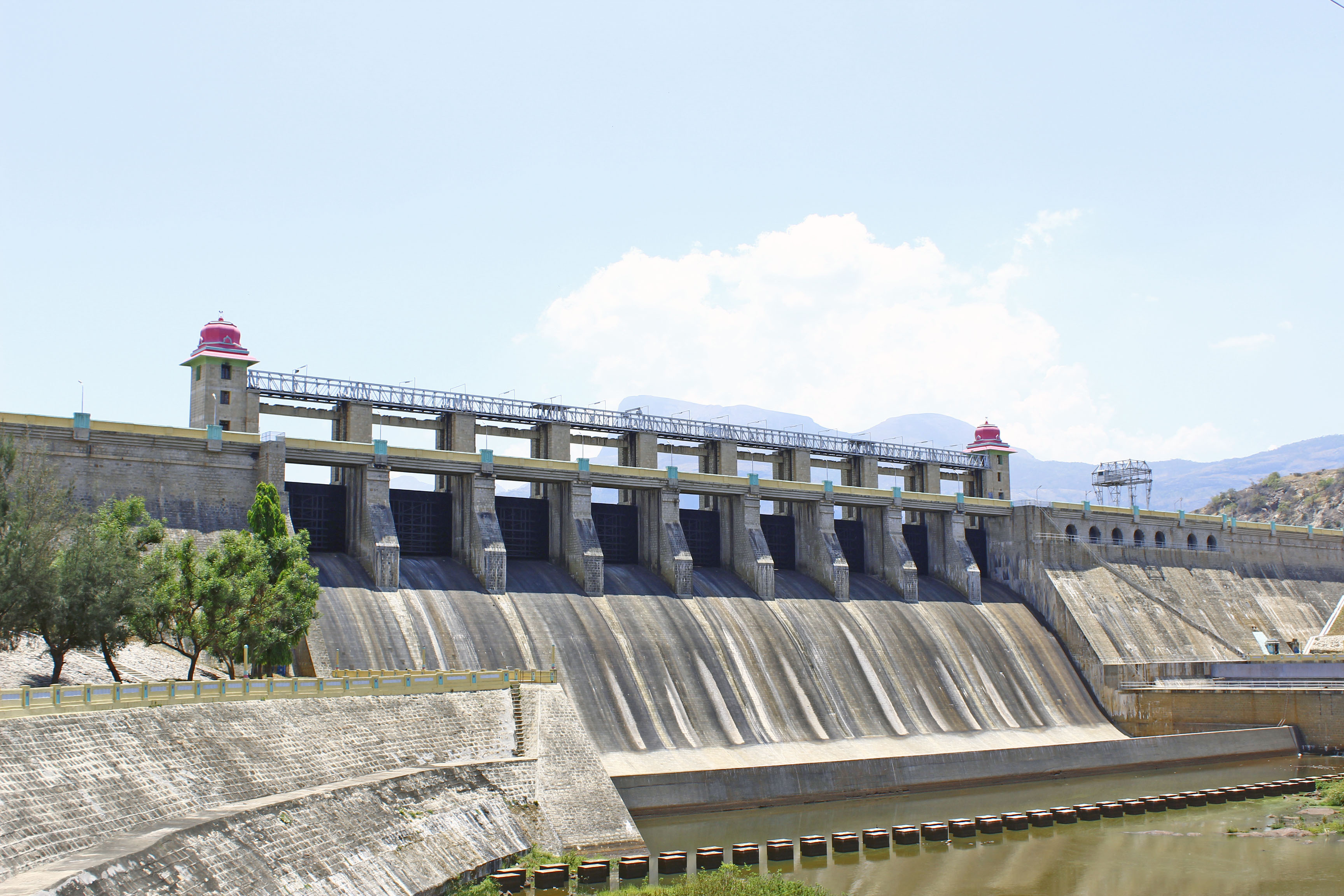
Amaravathi reservoir in amaravathi nagar

The dam was built in 1957 across the Amaravathi River about 25 km (16 mi) upstream and south from Thirumoorthy Dam. Capacity of the dam has shrunk 25% from 4 tmcft to 3 tmcft due to siltation. The dam was built primarily for irrigation and flood control. In 2005 - 2006 the state reported revenue from medium commercial irrigation from the Amaravathi Reservoir Project was Rs. 43,51,000. During 2003–04, the Tamil Nadu Electricity Board proposed to increase the dams utility by installing 4 MW capacity hydro-electric power station, which is now operating.

== Fisheries ==
The non-indigenous tilapia fish was introduced here in the 1950s and subsequently this reservoir had highest fish yield in the state by the 1970s. Tilapia now accounts for a major portion of the catch in the reservoir. Cast nets are commonly used for subsistence fishing. Normally, an individual fisherman can catch more than 20 kg/day of fish in the reservoir. The Fisheries department normally expects a yield of 110 tonnes/year of fish from the reservoir. In 1972, a fish yield of 168 kg/ha/yr (168 kg/yr x 931 ha = 156,408 kg/yr. = 156.408 tonnes/yr.) was reported.

The Fisheries Department has formed the Amaravathi Nagar Tribal Fishermen Cooperative Society to give tribals fishing rights in the Amaravathi Reservoir. In 2007, fifty tribals who reside at Karattupathi settlement, close to the reservoir, enrolled themselves as members of the society, and eight of them have received a fishing licence.

== Crocodiles ==
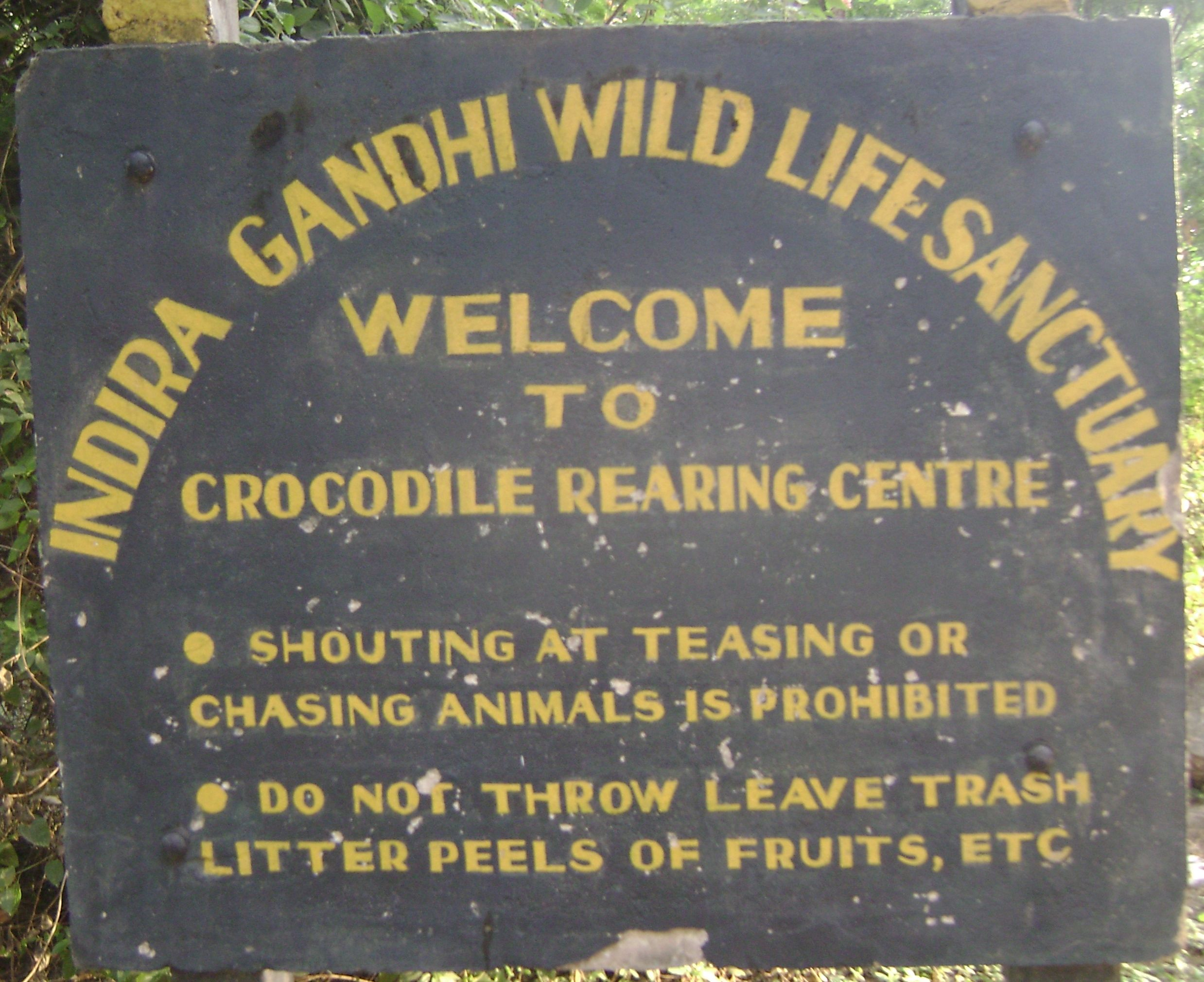
Crocodile Rearing Center

The largest wild breeding population of crocodiles in South India live in the reservoir, and in the Chinnar, Thennar and Pambar rivers that drain into it. These broad-snouted mugger crocodiles, also known as marsh crocodiles and Persian crocodiles, are the most common and widespread of the three species of crocodiles found in India. They eat fish, other reptiles, small and large mammals and are sometimes dangerous to humans. Their total wild population here is currently estimated to be 60 adults and 37 sub-adults. Other fish predators here include: Oriental small-clawed otters, Indian cormorants and Indian flap-shelled turtles.

The Amaravathi Sagar Crocodile Farm, established in 1976, the largest crocodile nursery in India, is 1 kilometre before the Amaravathi dam site. Many adult crocodiles have been reintroduced from here into the wild. Eggs are collected from wild nests along the perimeter of the reservoir to be hatched and reared at the farm. Many crocodiles of all sizes can be seen basking in the sun and suddenly making a stride or piled up on one another. There are now 98 crocodiles (25 male + 73 female) maintained in captivity here. Three Forest Department personnel manage and maintain the centre.,

== Visitor information ==
There is a well laid-out park where one may climb steep steps on the dam to have a picturesque view north of the plains below and south to the Anaimalai Hills and Palni Hills above. This place is being developed as a District Excursion Centre for tourism.

The park and crocodile farm are open every day from 9:00 a.m. to 6:00 p.m.

Travel by road From Coimbatore – via Pollachi and Udumalpet to Amaravathynagar is 96 km (60 mi).

Accommodation is available for four persons, with advance reservation, at a forest rest house near the crocodile farm. Rent is Rs.150 per day for two persons per suite.

== Gallery ==
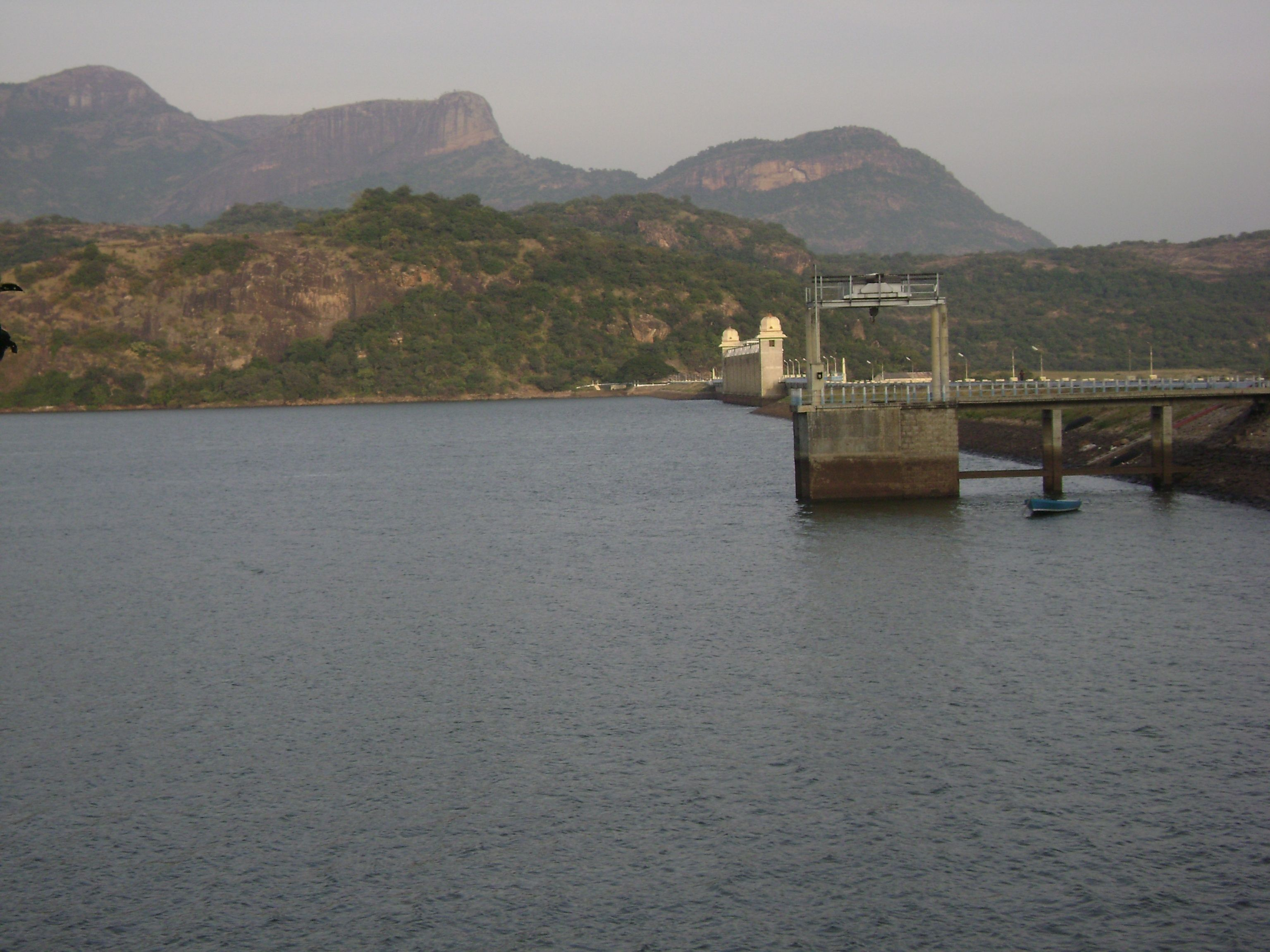
Amaravathi Reservoir & Dam

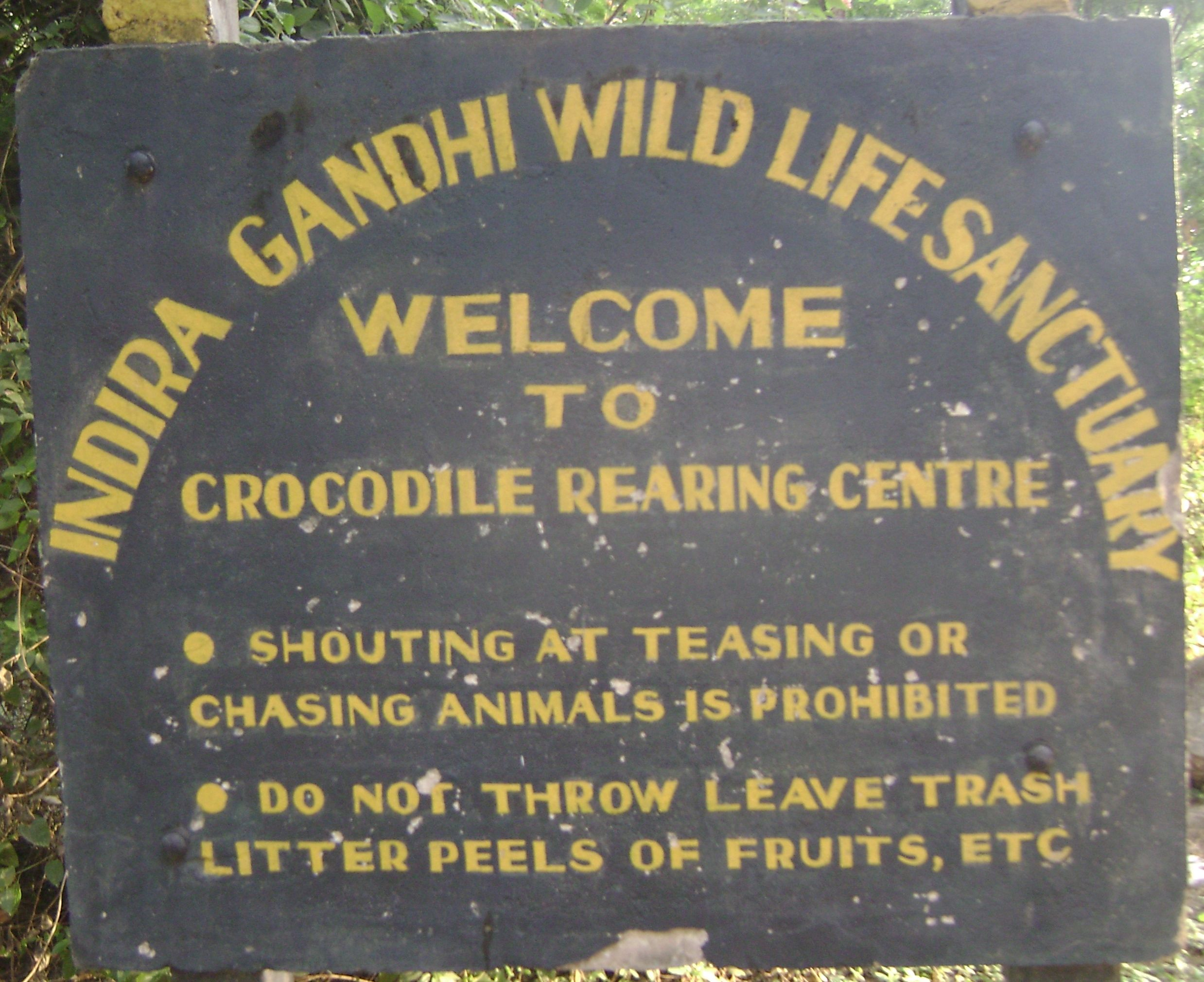
Sign at Amaravathi Crocodile Rearing Center

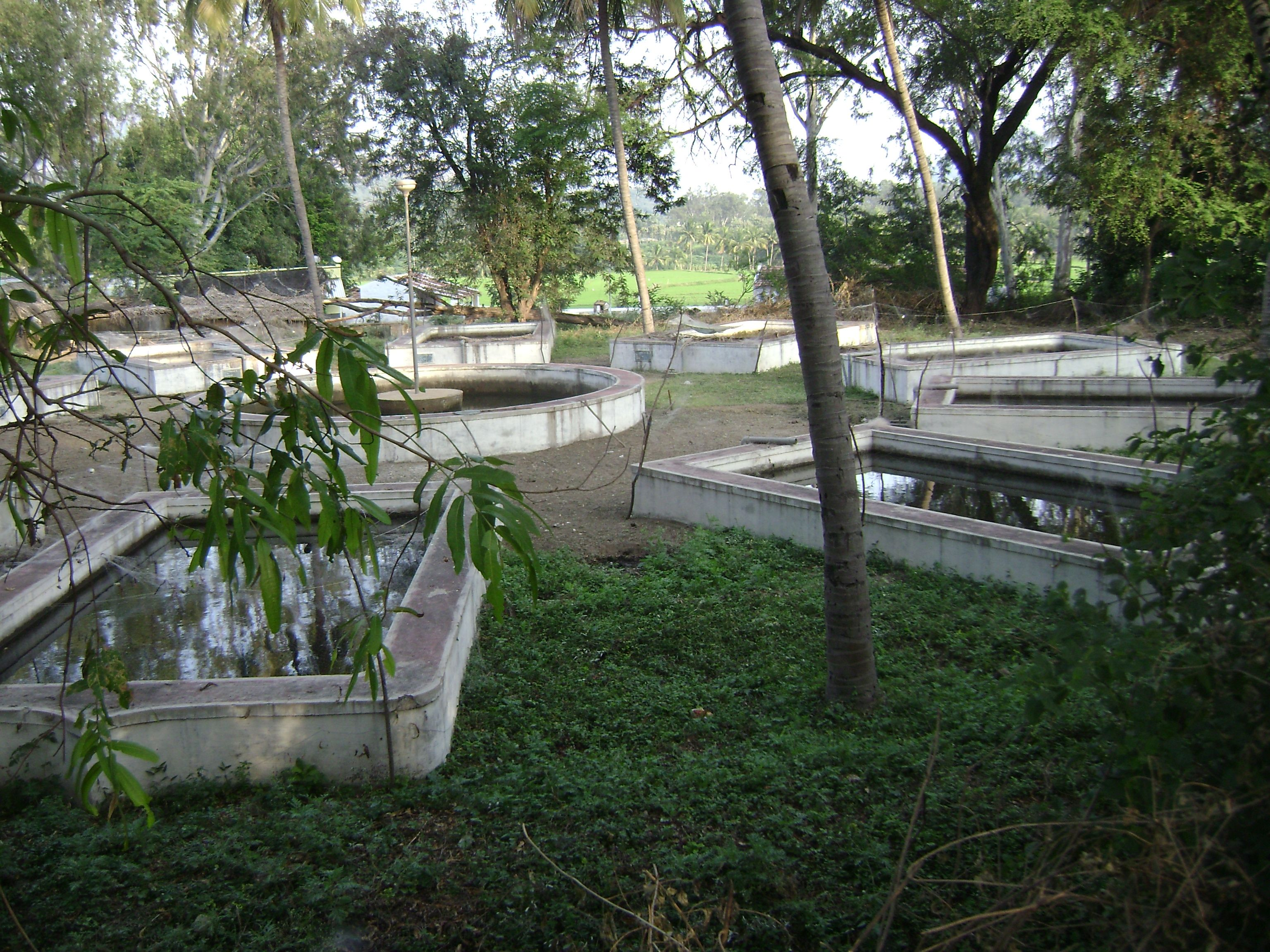
Fish Hatchery below Amaravathi Dam
