= Thirumoorthy hills =

Hills in Tamil Nadu, India

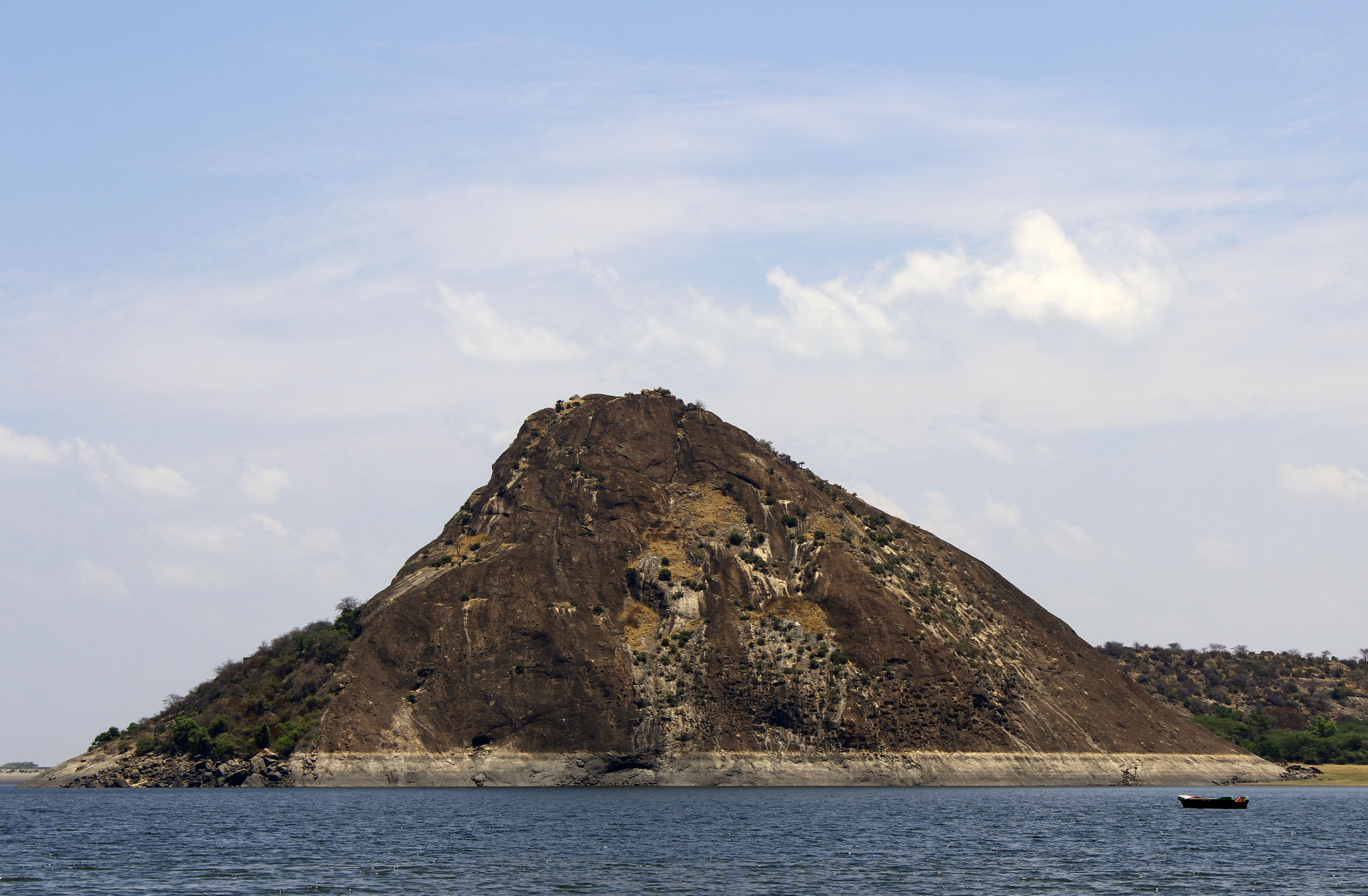
View of Thirumoorthi hills from the Thirumoorthi reservoir

Thirumoorthy hills or Thirumoorthi hills adjoin the Thirumoorthy dam. The features of the Anamalai hill range of Western Ghats, include the cascading water to the Thirumoorthy reservoir from the Panchalingam Falls. A perennial stream flows by the side of the Sri Amanalingeswarar temple.

== History ==
It is believed that a few thousand years ago Atri Maharishi along with his wife Anusuya devi lived here. Sage Narada praised Anusuya's "pativratyam" (Devotion to husband) a lot before the wives of Brahma-Vishnu-Shiva making them jealous of her. They requested their husbands to reduce her pativratyam. Brahma, Vishnu and Shiva went to Anusuya as guests when Atri was not there at home and asked her to serve them food. When she agreed to do so, they said that they will accept her alms on the condition that she serves them without wearing clothes. Anusuya falls into a dilemma. If she comes without clothes in front of other men her pativratyam will be reduced. If she refuses then that is dishonour to the guests and they can take away all the power of Atri. Anusuya felt that the three guests who asked such a strange favour are not normal people since they are trying to place her in a tricky situation. Anasuya prayed to her husband in her mind and said that she doesn't have any fear serving them without clothes as she is not affected by lust. Since the guests asked for alms saying "Bhavati Bhiksham Dehi" (Oh Mother! Give us some food) and indirectly called her a mother. She decided that she will consider them as her children and serve them as requested. Because of her greatness and as per her thinking by the time she came to serve food the three gods became small children and her breasts started producing milk. She then breastfed them and put them to sleep in a cradle. Atri came back afterwards and hearing the story from Anusuya praised the three gods sleeping in the cradle. They woke up in their original form and praised Anusuya's pativratyam and gave her a boon. Anasuya requested that these three should be born as her children—the incarnation of Shiva, Vishnu and Brahma as sage Durvasa, Dattatreya and the moon-god Chandra. Also, on seeing the power of devoting Anusuya devi, the Thiru Moorthi's blessed the couple and hence the place is known as Thiru Moorthi hills. It has an old temple with some rare sculptures with a spacious front hall.

It is also believed that Jain priests or Samanar lived in the hills when Jainism flourished in Tamil Nadu. The huge rock which is worshiped as Thirumoorthy has a sculpture of a Jain priest. A popular belief is that this rock rolled down from the hills few centuries back during a flood. This is supported by the fact that sculpture is carved upside down on rock .

== Climate ==
Temperature varies from moderate to quite cool. The best times for travelling there are from September to December.

- During the summer it is between 25 and 30 °C and
- During the winter it is between 20 and 25 °C.
- The average rainfall is 1550 mm[1].

== Spiritual ==
Thirumoorthy hills is also home to the Universal Peace Foundation. It is an international non-profitable organisation with its fundamental aim to emerge Universal Peace through Individual Peace. The foundation is also involved in the practice of Kundalini yoga. The foundation is under the guidance of an enlightened Yogic Guru, "Guru Mahan Paranjothiar".

== Entertainment ==
There is a waterfall called Panjalinga falls which is about three kilometers climbing over the hills. Thirumoorthy hill is the major cine shooting spot in the Coimbatore District where most of the Malayalam and Tamil movies are taken here due to the pleasant climate and view of nature. There is also a swimming pool and a garden and boating facilities in the dam.

== Nearest tourist locations ==
- The Crocodile Farm at Amaravathi Dam is approximately 25 km from here
- Palani Hills
- Topslip
- Marayoor
- Munnar
- Valparai
- Azhiyar

== See also ==
- Udumalpet
- Dharapuram
- Coimbatore
- Kodaikanal
- Palani
- Pollachi
