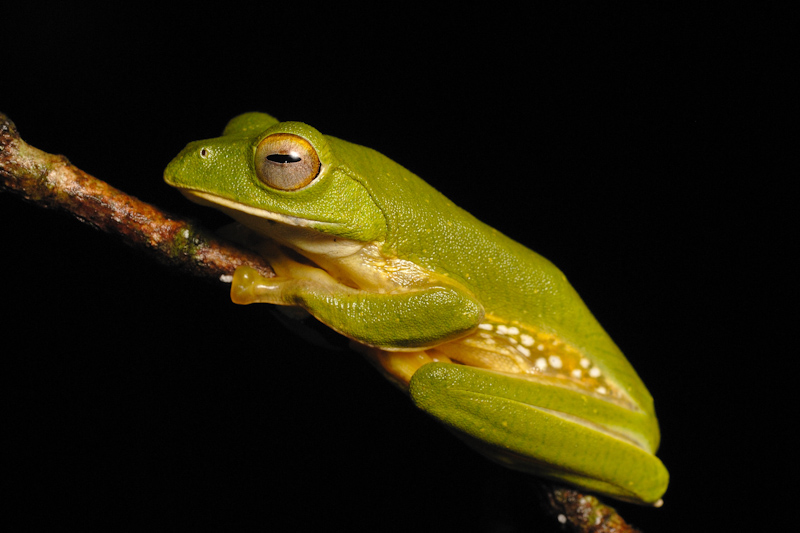

Conservation status
- Vulnerable (IUCN 3.1)

Scientific classification
- Kingdom: Animalia
- Phylum: Chordata
- Class: Amphibia
- Order: Anura
- Family: Rhacophoridae
- Genus: Rhacophorus
- Species: R. pseudomalabaricus

Binomial name
- Rhacophorus pseudomalabaricus Vasudevan and Dutta, 2000

= Rhacophorus pseudomalabaricus =

Species of amphibian

Rhacophorus pseudomalabaricus, also known as Anaimalai flying frog, false Malabar gliding frog, and false Malabar tree frog, is a species of frog in the family Rhacophoridae. It is endemic to the Anaimalai Hills, a part of the southern the Western Ghats in the Tamil Nadu and Kerala states, India.

== Description ==
Adult males measure 47–54 mm (1.9–2.1 in) and adult females 66–72 mm (2.6–2.8 in) in snout–vent length. The eyes are protruding. The supra-tympanic fold is distinct. The fingers and toes are extensively webbed; the webbing is light yellow to red-orange in color. Juveniles have distinctive black zebra-like pattern that becomes fainter in adults, resembling venation of leaf; the background colour is green. Scientists note that this is the only species in Rhacophorus to resemble a leaf in this way and speculate its purpose is camouflage.

== Habitat and conservation ==
Rhacophorus pseudomalabaricus has been recorded in tropical moist evergreen forest, in secondary forests on the fringe of abandoned cardamom plantation, in a marshy area beside a perennial stream outside a cardamom plantation, and near an artificial water hole between the evergreen forest and tea plantation. Specimens have been recorded both in lower canopy and understorey vegetation and on the ground. Its elevational range is 955–1,430 m (3,133–4,692 ft) above sea level. Scientists note that one easy way to tell this frog apart from R. malabaricus is to obeserve the elevation at which the specimen was found: R. malabaricus lives closer to sea level.

Reproduction takes place on vegetation overhanging marshy areas, ponds, and streams. The male frog's advertisement call resembles "trrr tik tik tik tik trrrr." Amplexus can last one hour. The female frog uses her hind legs and fluid from a gland near her cloaca to make a foam nest in which she deposits eggs, which the male subsequently fertilizes. The female frog will then cover the nest with leaves or grass using her front limbs.

This species is known from at least two protected areas, Indira Gandhi National Park and Parambikulam Tiger Reserve. Outside the protected areas, it is threatened by habitat loss caused by conversion of forests to other uses as well as by timber extraction, and conversion of forest to pastureland.

Many nearby humans harbor a dislike for this frog: Cardamom farmers believe that the frog eats cardamom fruit and so consider the frog an agricultural pest. Scientists note that there is currently no evidence for or against this belief. Some farmers will pay others to catch and kill the frog. There is also a local belief that the frog is a bad omen, especially for pregnant women.

This frog is one of many that is subject to capture for the illegal pet trade.
