= N. A. Naseer =

Indian photographer

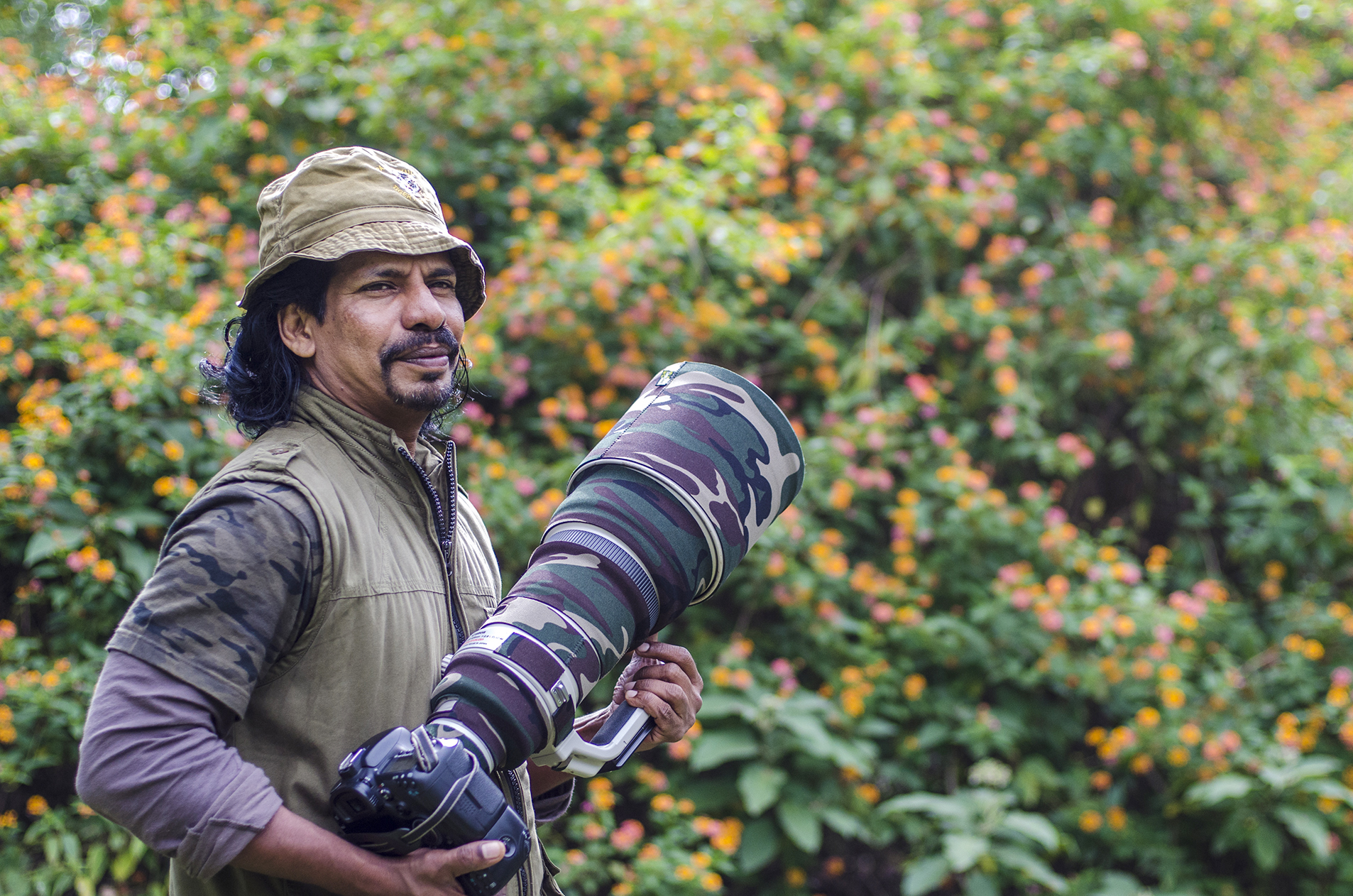
- Born: 10 June 1962 (age 64); Ernakulam district, Kerala State, India
- Known for: Wildlife photography, conservation of nature, and authoring books

N. A. Naseer, (born 10 June 1962) in Ernakulam district, Kerala, is an Indian wildlife photographer, nature conservation activist and author, who is a member of the Bombay Natural History Society. He is sometimes called the ambassador of Kerala's forests. He is also a martial artist (karate, thai-chi, chi gung).

== Career ==
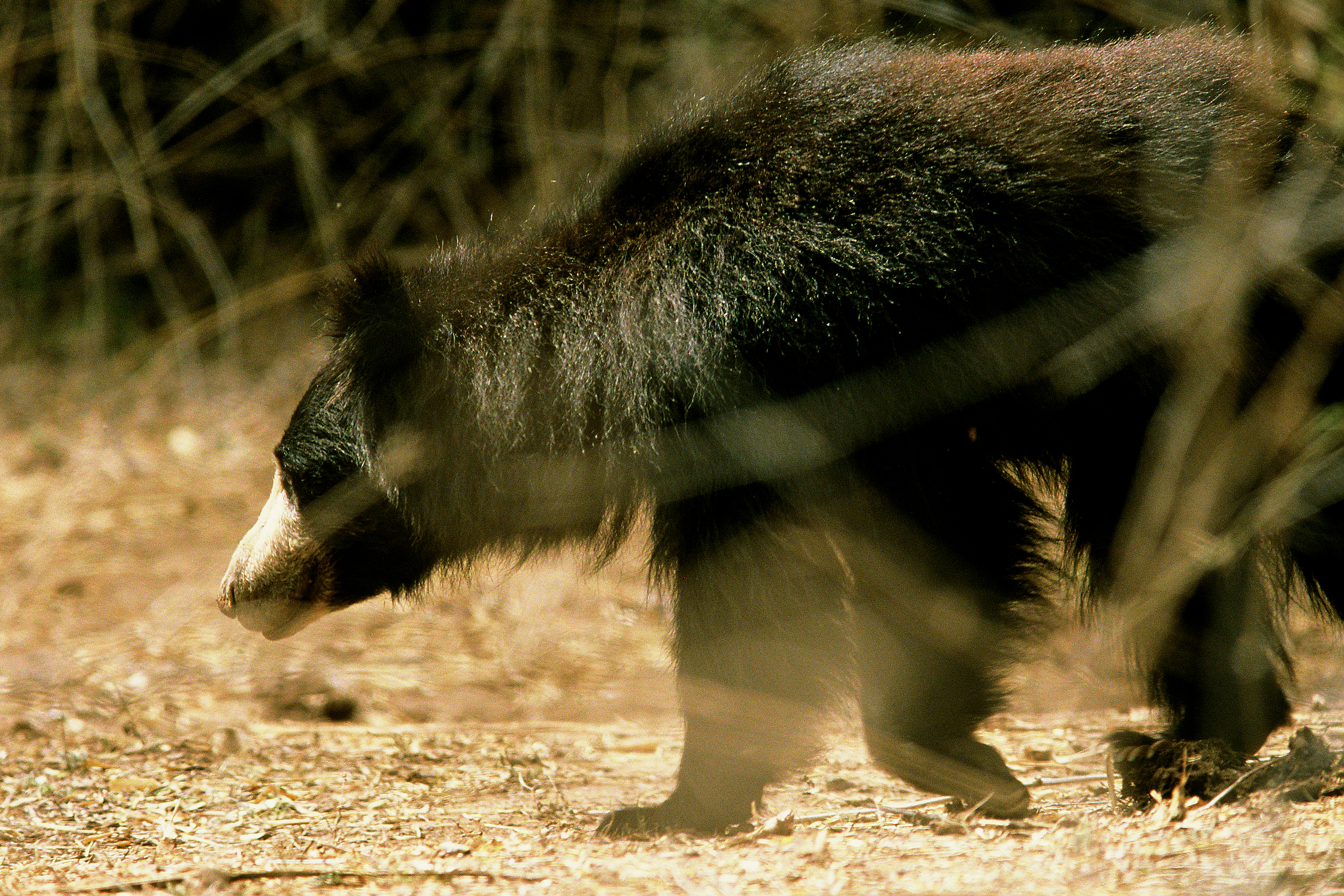
A sloth bear photographed by Naseer.

In addition to leading Malayalam periodicals, he writes on wildlife with photographs, in magazines like the Mathrubhumi Yathra travel magazine, Mathrubhumi weekly Sanctuary Asia, Hornbill, Frontline, Outlook, Traveller, and others. Besides conducting sessions about nature conservation, photography all over South India, he teaches martial arts.

=== Books ===
- Woods and Photographer, which was the first book on wildlife which was written in Malayalam, Naseer's mother tongue, and sold out three months after being published. It has photographs of fauna native to South India.
- Kadine chennu thodumbol:
- Kadum Camerayum
- Vranam pootha chantham
- Malamuzhakki (2020)
- Kattil oppam nadannavarum pozhinju poyavarum

== Awards and honours ==
- 2013-KR Devanand Memorial Award
- 2011-Excellency in Photography award by All Kerala Photography Association

== See also ==
- Sandesh Kadur
