= Karattuppatti =

- Village
- Location in Tamil Nadu, India
- Coordinates: 10.6820267°N 78.3232125°E
- Country: India
- State: Tamil Nadu
- District: Tiruchirappalli

Languages
  - Official: Tamil
- Time zone: UTC+5:30 (IST)

Karattuppatti is a village in the Manapparai taluk, Tiruchirappalli district in the Indian state of Tamil Nadu
