= Mudugar =

Indigenous people of the Attappadi valley, Kerala, India

Mudugar are indigenous people who live mainly in the Attappadi valley in Palakkad district of Kerala, South India.

== Disambiguation ==
The Mudugar are often misidentified as Muthuvan or Muduvan. C. R. Sathyanarayana, an anthropologist, notes that "the nomenclature Muduvar, Muduvan, and Muthuvan (found in the lists of Census of India) represent one and the same community while the Mudugar constitute altogether a different community." In fact, Muthuvan and Muduvan are different names for a group which lives far away from the Mudugar, predominantly in the Cardamom Hills and Anamalai hills of Idukki district.

== Population ==
Census of Kerala identified 9,903 Mudugar individuals from 2,185 families living in 88 settlements covering 67.6 km^{2} in the state.

16 out of 21 tribal hamlets in the Attappadi range are notorious for ganja cultivation. Many tribals live in abject poverty and are easily recruited by the so-called ganja mafia.

== Customs ==
Marriage is normal at age 12 to 14 years and includes many rituals and ceremonies. The wedding is usually conducted in the groom's house. The groom has to give dowry to the bride's father. There is a grand vegetarian feast on the wedding day.

It is normal and acceptable for an adolescent to marry their first or second cousin or even the second spouse of a parent. Occurrence of in-breeding is up to 80%, resulting in a significantly high combined in utero, infant and child mortality rate of 38%. Polygamy is prevalent.

== Decreasing child birth ==
Sixty five families living in Vellimudi and Sankarankudy villages in Valparai taluk in Coimbatore district in Tamil Nadu have reported no child birth in the past ten years (2000–2010). This was followed by 4 to 7 children in each family in previous years. Decrease in child birth has also been observed in Muduvar people living in Poochikottaparai, Selaiyoothu, Karumutti, Vasambukulam villages near Udumulai. While the causes leading to infertility is unknown, it will likely have a severe impact on Muduvar population.

== See also ==
- Muduga language
