= Kukal =

Origin
- Language: Czech
- Region of origin: Czech Republic

Other names
- Variant form: Koukal

Kukal is a Czech and Slavic surname. Notable people with the surname include:

- Jan Kukal (born 1942), Czech tennis player
- Karel Kukal (1927–2016), Czech Scout
- Olga Kukal (fl. 1980s–1990s), Canadian biologist
- Ondřej Kukal (born 1964), Czech conductor
- Petr Kukal (born 1970), Czech Writer
- Zdeněk Kukal (1932–2021), Czech oceanologist, geologist and oceanographer

== See also ==
- Kükəl, Azerbaijan
