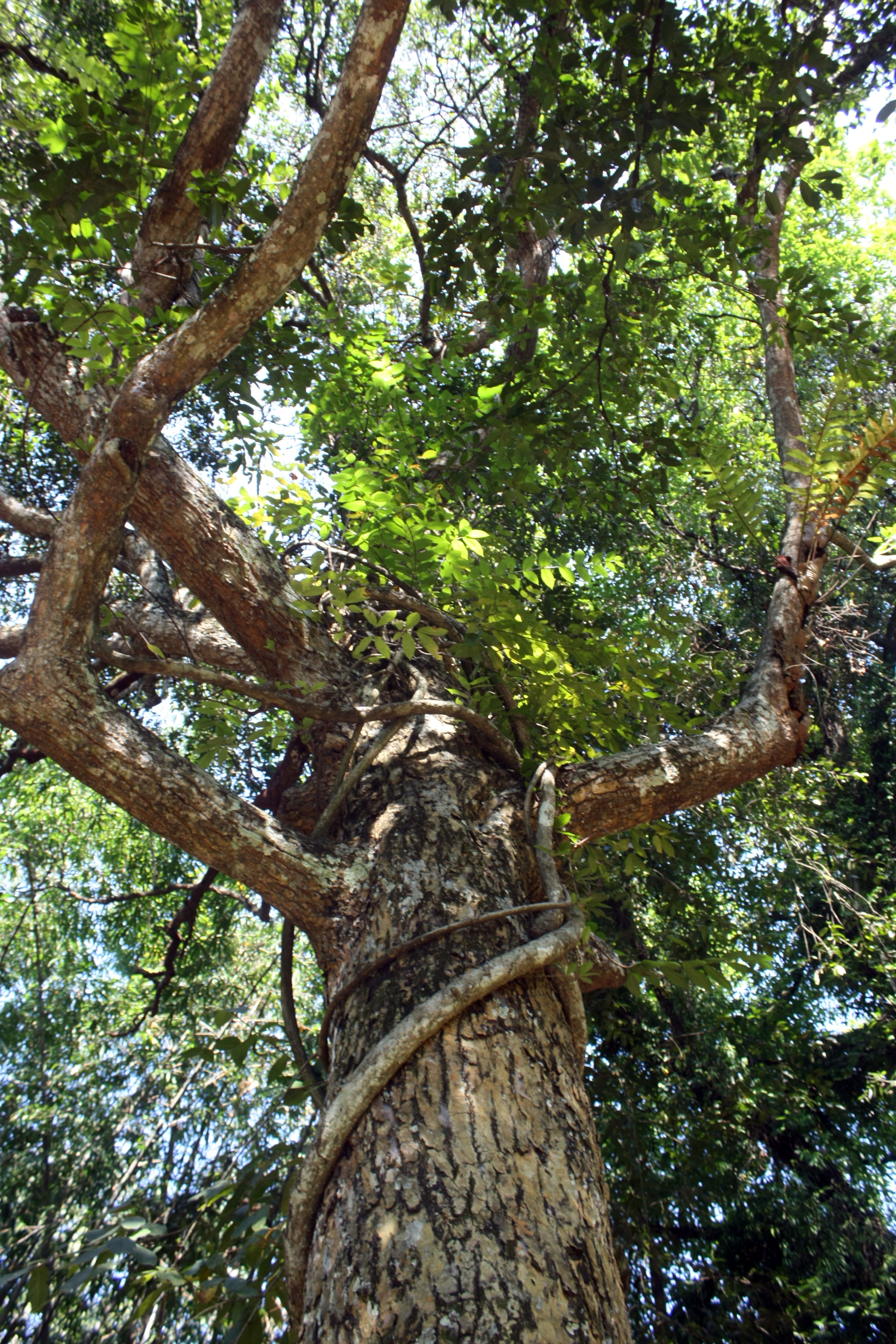

Conservation status
- Vulnerable (IUCN 2.3)

Scientific classification
- Kingdom: Plantae
- Clade: Tracheophytes
- Clade: Angiosperms
- Clade: Eudicots
- Clade: Rosids
- Order: Malpighiales
- Family: Calophyllaceae
- Genus: Calophyllum
- Species: C. tomentosum

Binomial name
- Calophyllum tomentosum Wight

= Calophyllum tomentosum =

Species of flowering plant

Calophyllum tomentosum is a species of flowering plant in the family Calophyllaceae, commonly known as bintangur. It is found in Sri Lanka and the Western Ghats.
