= Anamalai Tiger Reserve =

Wildlife sanctuary and national park in Tamil Nadu, India

- Indira Gandhi Wildlife Sanctuary and National Park
- IUCN category IV (habitat/species management area)
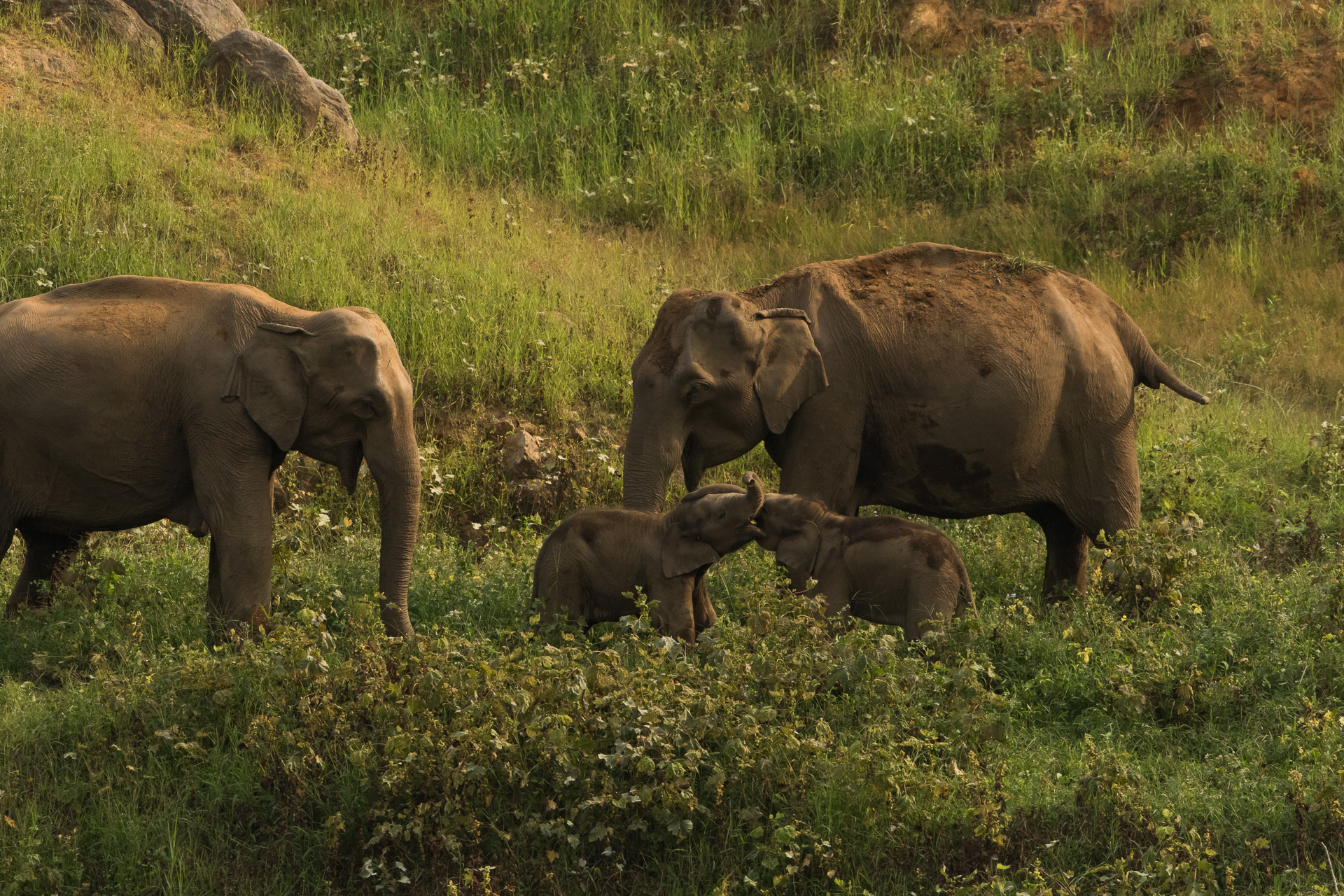
- Asian elephants in Anamalai Tiger Reserve

- Location within Tamil Nadu Location within India
- Interactive map of Anamalai Tiger Reserve
- Location: Coimbatore District, Tamil Nadu, India
- Coordinates: 10.4170°N 77.0567°E
- Area: 1,479.87 km^{2} (571.38 sq mi)
- Established: 1976
- Governing body: Tamil Nadu Forest Department
- Website: www.forests.tn.gov.in

Anamalai Tiger Reserve, earlier known as Indira Gandhi Wildlife Sanctuary and National Park and as Anaimalai Wildlife Sanctuary, is a protected area in the Anaimalai Hills of Pollachi and Valparai taluks of Coimbatore District and Udumalaipettai taluk in Tiruppur District, Tamil Nadu, India. The Tamil Nadu Environment and Forests Department by a notification dated 27 June 2007, declared an extent of 958.59 km^{2} that encompassed the erstwhile IGWLS&NP or Anaimalai Wildlife Sanctuary, as Anaimalai Tiger Reserve under the Wildlife Protection Act, 1972. According to the National Tiger Conservation Authority, the Reserve presently includes a core area of 958.59 km^{2} and buffer/peripheral area of 521.28 km^{2} forming a total area of 1479.87 km^{2}.

== Etymology ==
The park is named after former Prime Minister of India, Indira Gandhi who visited the park on 7 October 1961. The main tourist facilities are located in the northeast corner of the park at "Topslip", so named because of the local 19th century practice of sliding timber logs down the hills from here.

== History ==
Boundary of the Anamalai Tiger Reserve

By the mid-1800s, large tracts of Valparai plateau in the Anamalais were under intense tea or coffee plantations after deforestation of the natural forests. By 1866 two-thirds of the plantations were owned by Europeans and the remaining by Indians from coastal towns. Since most native inhabitants either refused to work or were inefficient workers, labour for plantations was brought from the plains of Tamil Nadu to clear forests and grow coffee.

Some parts of the forest however were reserved for timber including large areas around Top Slip. This part of the Western Ghats, under the Madras Presidency were exploited extensively for teak which was supplied to the Bombay Dockyard for shipbuilding and later for railroad ties.

In 1855, this area came under sustainable forest management for teak plantations by the pioneering efforts Douglas Hamilton and H. F. Cleghorn of the new Tamil Nadu Forest Department. In the early 1900s, protection of the Karian shola was also ensured.

The area was notified as Anaimalai Wildlife Sanctuary in 1974. of its unique habitats at 3 places – Karian Shola, Grass hills, Manjampatti Valley were notified as a National Park in 1989. The 108 square kilometres (42 sq mi) National Park is the core area of the 958 square kilometres (370 sq mi) Indira Gandhi Wildlife Sanctuary. IGWS was declared a Project Tiger tiger reserve in 2008.

The Park and the Sanctuary is under consideration by UNESCO as part of The Western Ghats World Heritage Site. The Sanctuary and the Palni Hills in Dindigul District form the Aanaimalai Conservation Area.

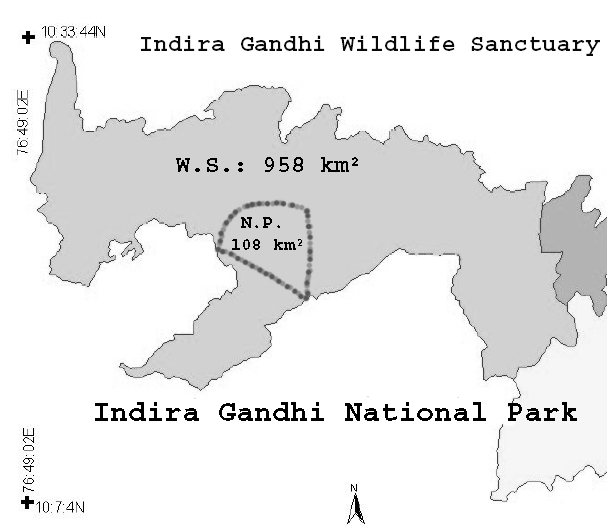
IGWS&NP, Grass Hills area, Konalar Hut 10°19′22″N 77°04′17″E

The Steering Committee of Project Tiger granted approval in principle to inclusion of Indira Gandhi WLS and NP under Project Tiger in 2005. IGWS was declared a Project Tiger sanctuary in 2008. Continuance of "Project Tiger" in Anamalai Tiger Reserve for FY 2010/11, at the cost of ₹ 23,547,000 was approved by the National Tiger Conservation Authority on 31 August 2010.

This tiger reserve, together with the several other contiguous protected forest and grassland habitats, is the core of the Parambikulum-Indira Gandhi tiger habitat landscape complex, with tiger occupancy area of about 3,253 km^{2} (1,256 sq mi) and an estimated metapopulation of 42 tigers.

== Geography ==
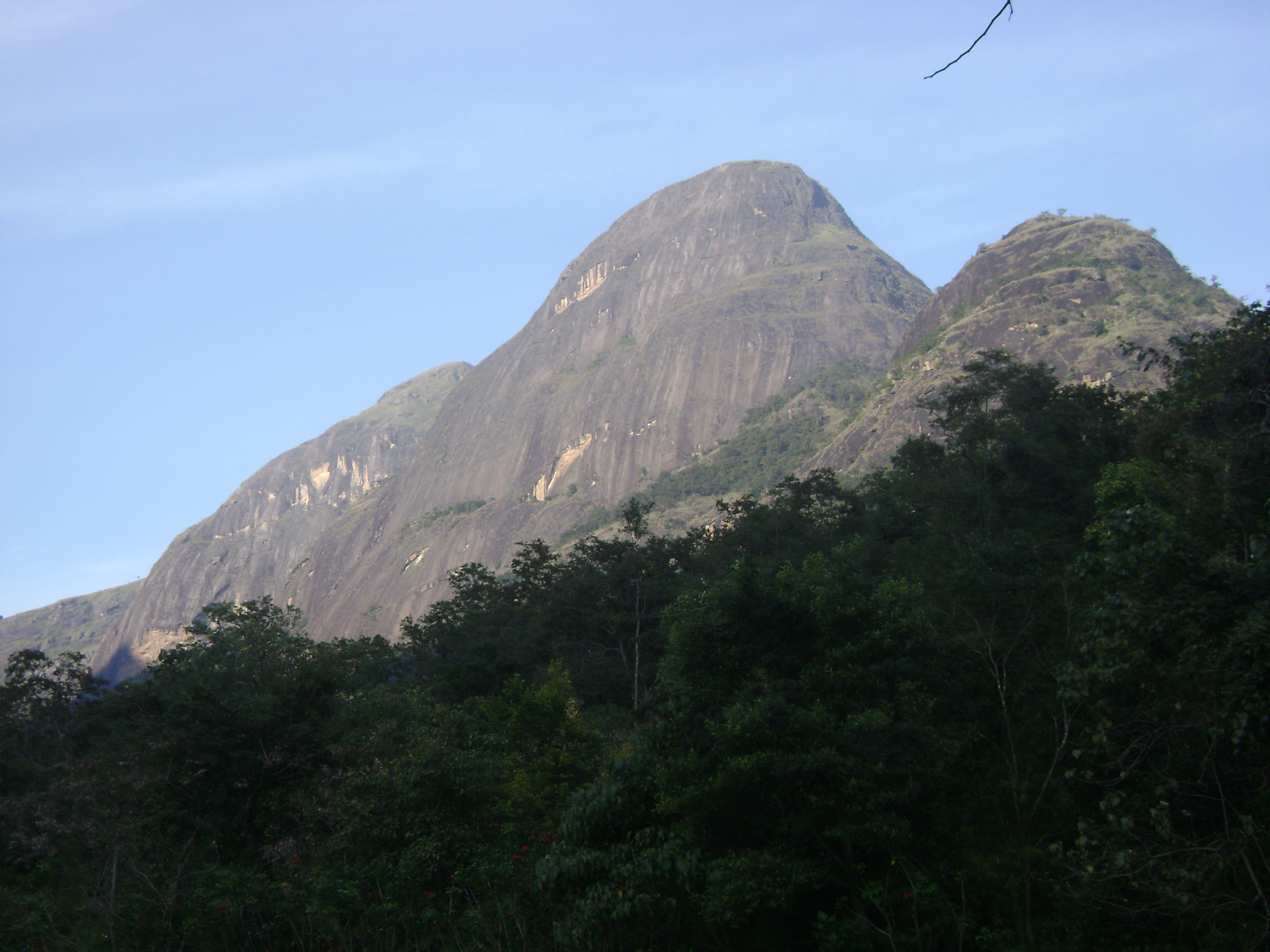
Jambu Malai

Mean annual rainfall is between 500 mm (20 in) in the south western fringes and 4,500 millimetres (180 in) on the north east. This Sanctuary is an important watershed for the agricultural economy and power supply in other parts of Tamil Nadu. Major reservoirs like Parambikulam Reservoir, Aliyar Reservoir, Thirumurthi Reservoir, Upper Aliyar Reservoir, Kadambarai, Sholayar Dam and Amaravathi Dam are fed by the perennial rivers which originate from the Sanctuary.

The sanctuary has six administrative ranges;

- Pollachi: a southern town of Coimbatore District, its range headquarters at Anaimalai Farm: 109.72 km^{2} (42.36 sq mi)
- Valparai Water Falls: 171.5 km^{2} (66.2 sq mi)
- Ulandy Top Slip: 75.93 km^{2} (29.32 sq mi)
- Amaravathi Reservoir: Amaravathi Nagar: 172.5 km^{2} (66.6 sq mi)
- Udumalpet: 290.18 km^{2} (112.04 sq mi).

IGWLS is adjacent to Parambikulam Wildlife Sanctuary to the west. The core area of Manjampatti Valley is a 110 km^{2} (42 sq mi)with a drainage basin at the eastern end of the park. Manjampatti Valley is contiguous with Chinnar Wildlife Sanctuary to the south and the proposed Palani Hills Wildlife Sanctuary and National Park to the east. The National park enters Ernakulam district and Idukki district of Kerala (the Pooyamkutty forest), from the tribal settlement of Edamalakudy, Idukki. Elevation ranges between 340 m (1,120 ft) and 2,513 m (8,245 ft).

== Flora ==
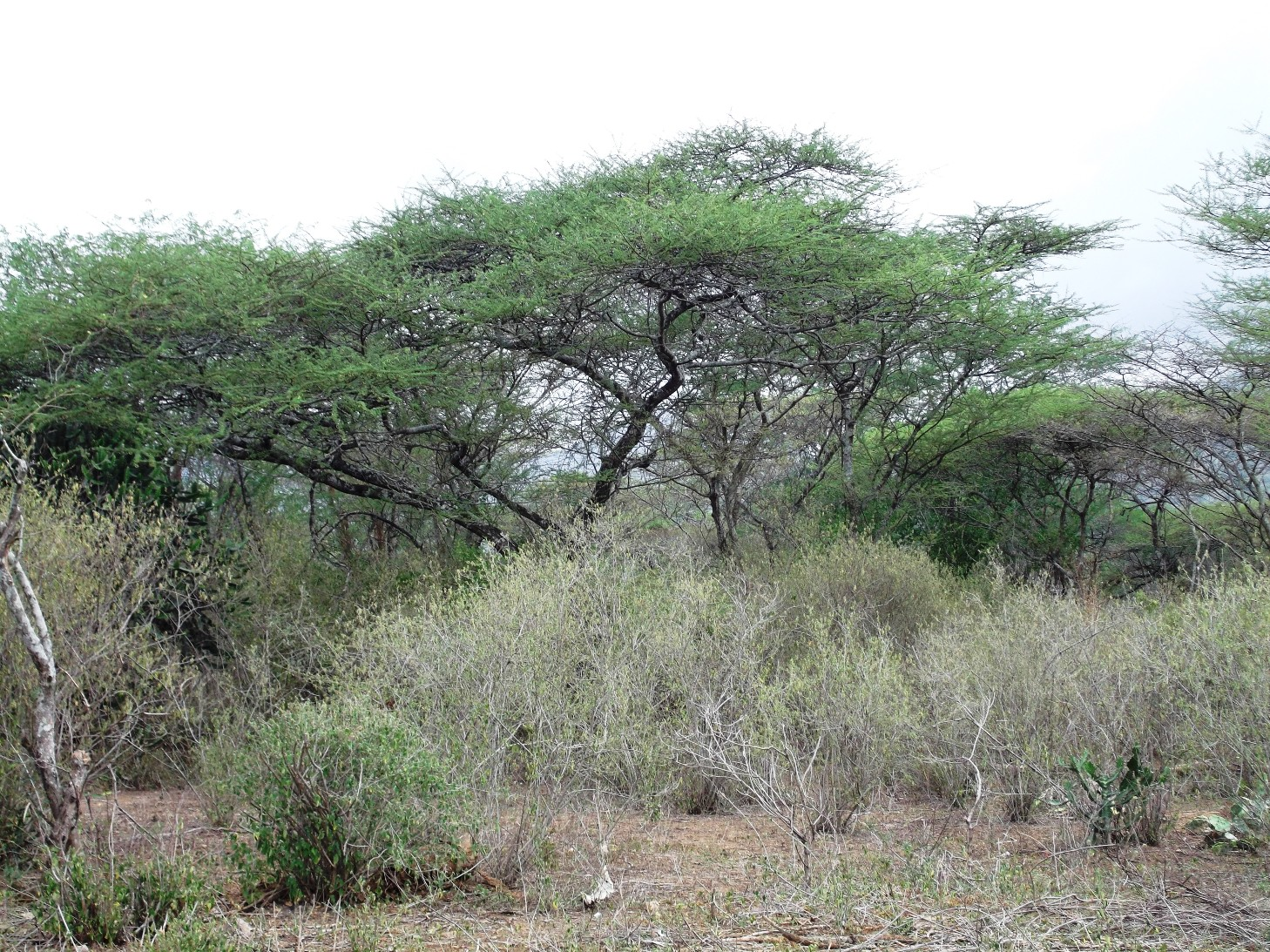
Dry deciduous forest in Anamalai Tiger Reserve

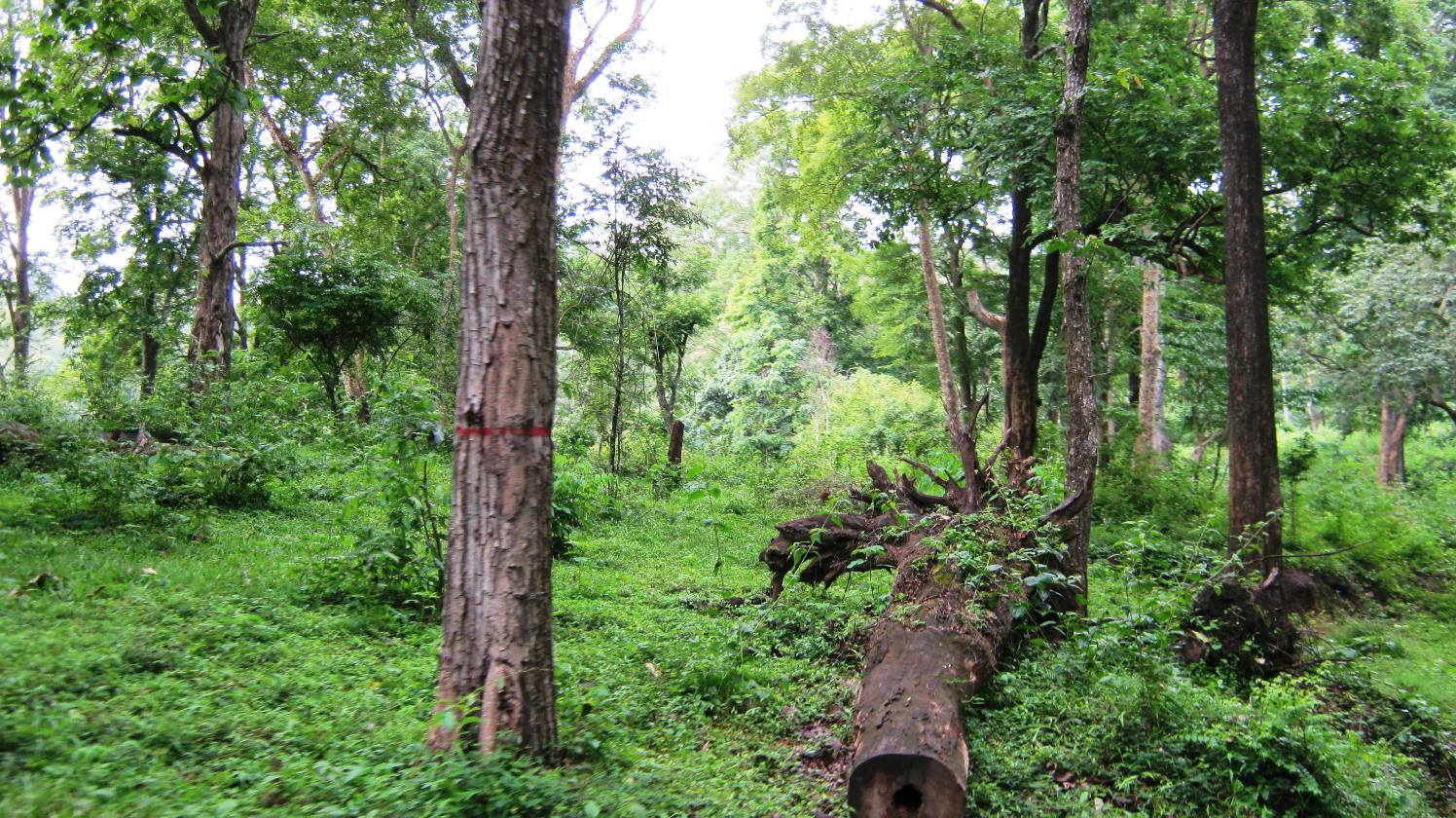
Moist deciduous forest

The park is home to a wide variety of flora typical of the southern Western Ghats. There are over 2000 plant species, of which about 400 species are of prime medicinal value. The diverse topography and rainfall gradient allow a wide variety of vegetation comprising a mix of natural and human-made habitats. The former includes tropical and subtropical moist broadleaf forests and East Deccan dry evergreen forests, montane shola-grassland, tropical and subtropical dry broadleaf forest, Deccan thorn scrub forests and marshes.

South Western Ghats montane rain forests occur at higher elevations and are interspersed with montane grasslands, forming the shola-grassland complex. Much of the original forest now contains introduced teak plantations. Bamboo stands and reed beds occur in the natural forests. Tree cover is provided by Hopea parviflora, Mesua ferrea, Calophyllum tomentosum, Vateria indica, Cullenia excelsa and Mangifera indica, Machilus macrantha, Alstonia scholaris, Evodia meliaefolia, Ailanthus and Bombax ceiba and Eucalyptus grandis. The area is home to Podocarpus wallichianus, a rare south Indian species of conifer.

== Fauna ==
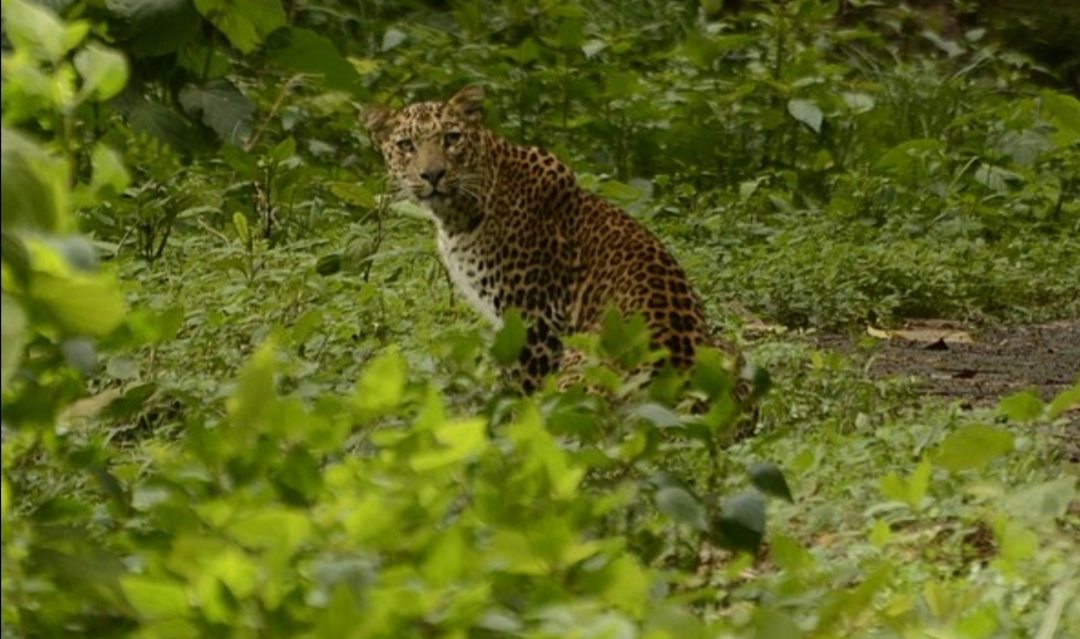
Leopard in Anamalai

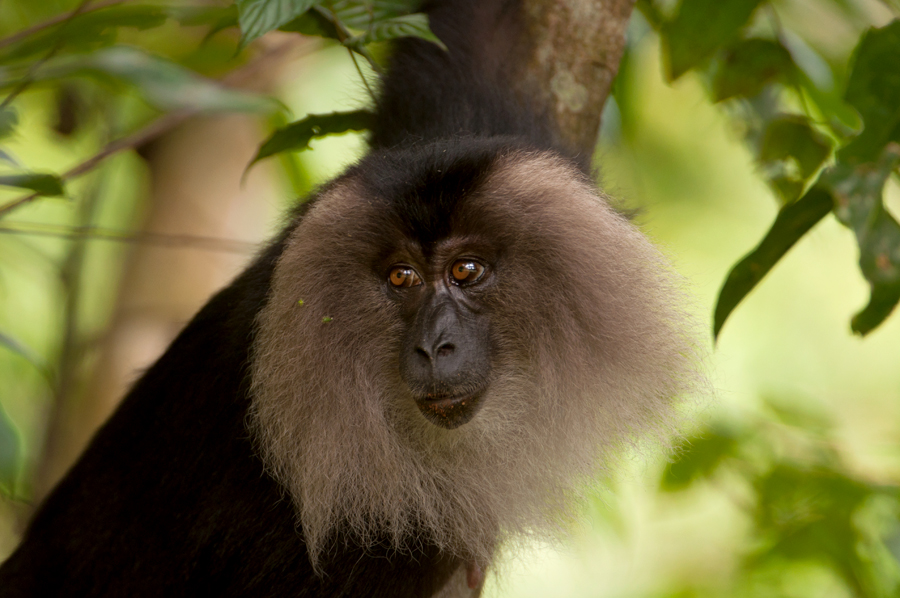
Young lion-tailed macaque

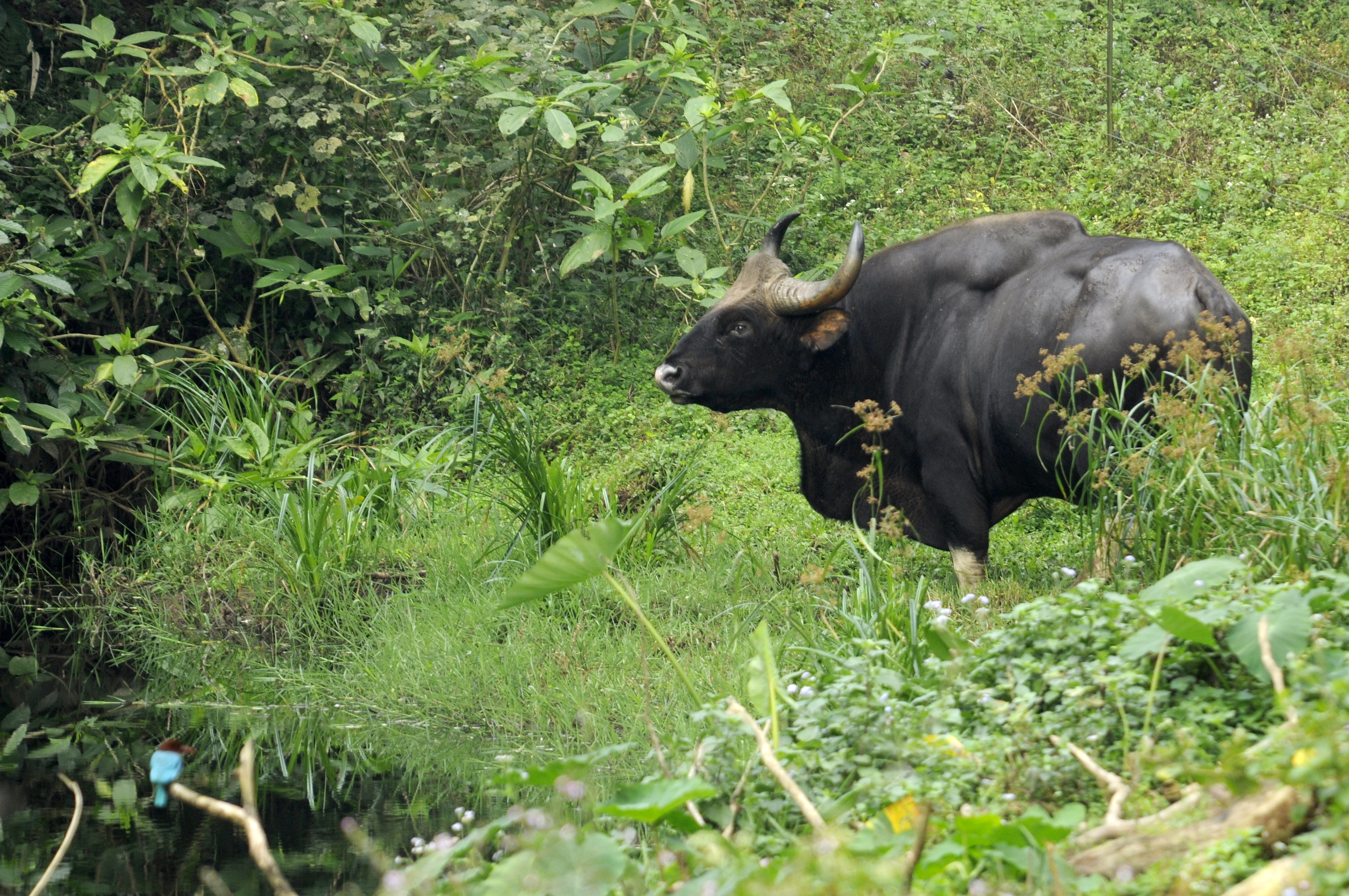
Gaur and white-throated kingfisher

Threatened species of mammals in the Anamalai Tiger Reserve include Bengal tiger, Indian elephant, Indian leopard, dhole, Nilgiri tahr and lion-tailed macaque, Indian brown mongoose, gaur, Malabar spiny dormouse, Nilgiri langur, rusty-spotted cat, sambar deer, sloth bear and smooth-coated otter, Indian giant squirrel, Indian leopard and Indian pangolin.

Animals of least concern here include: golden jackal, leopard cat, jungle cat, chital, Indian muntjac, Indian spotted chevrotain, wild boar, gray langur, bonnet macaque, Asian palm civet, small Indian civet, Indian grey mongoose, striped-necked mongoose, ruddy mongoose, grey slender loris, Indian giant squirrel, Indian crested porcupine, Indian pangolin, Indian porcupine and Indian palm squirrel.

Over 250 species of birds have been identified in the park. Some of the most important groups are cormorants, ducks, darter, partridge, quail, jungle fowl, spurfowl, Indian peafowl, parakeets, hornbills, Asian barbets, drongos, orioles, shrikes, warblers, Old World flycatchers, woodpeckers, leafbird, trogons, kingfishers, storks, egrets, Lesser fish eagles, hawk eagles, harriers, falcons, kites, owls and nightjars. It is also home to the near-threatened great Indian hornbill.

It is home to 15 of 16 species of birds endemic to the Western Ghats.

Amphibians and Reptiles include many rare and endemic forms. Some endemic amphibians are the ancient and elusive purple frog, toad skinned frog, thin-legged leaping frog and forest torrent frog, Gadgil's torrent frogs, Anaimalai flying frog, bush frogs and caecilian such as the Uraeotyphlus. Reptiles include the Indian rock python, king cobras, Bengal monitors, Malabar pit vipers, Large-scaled green pit vipers, Nilgiri keelbacks, some 20 species of curious little shield tail snakes, large-scaled forest lizards, Nilgiri forest lizard, flying lizards, Ristella skinks forest cane turtles, and Travancore tortoises.

315 species of butterflies belonging to five families have been identified in the Anaimalai Hills. 44 are endemic to the Western Ghats.

== Tribal Communities ==
The Reserve has significant anthropological diversity with more than 4600 Adivasi people from six tribes of indigenous people living in 34 settlements. The tribes are the Kadars, Malasars, Pulaiyars, Mudugars and the Eravallan (Eravalar).

In 1997, annual celebration of Elephant Pongal at Top Slip was begun. For Pongal, several decorated elephants stand in front of the Pongal pot to mark the commencement of the celebration. The elephants are fed chakkarai pongal, banana and sugarcane while lined up behind a barricade, so tourists can have a close look. In 2011, Elephant Pongal was celebrated on 18 January.
