= Udumalaipettai =

Udumalaipettai Udumalpet
- town
- Thirumoorthy Hills
- Nicknames: Windmill Town, Sugarcane Town
- Udumalaipettai, Tamil Nadu
- Coordinates: 10.585500°N 77.251300°E
- Country: India
- State: Tamil Nadu
- District: Tiruppur
- Region: Tamil
- Established: 1918

Government
  - Type: Special Grade Municipality
  - Body: Udumalaipettai Municipality
  - Chairman: M Matheen

Area
  - Total: 24.41 km^{2} (9.42 sq mi)
  - Rank: 2 nd in Dt
- Elevation: 387 m (1,270 ft)

Population (2011)
  - Total: 61,133
  - Density: 2,504/km^{2} (6,486/sq mi)

Languages
  - Official: Tamil
- Time zone: UTC+5:30 (IST)
- PIN: 642126
- Telephone code: 04252
- Vehicle registration: TN 78M
- Website: https://www.udumalaipettai.in/

Udumalaipettai also known as Udumalai, is a town in Tiruppur district in the Indian state of Tamil Nadu. It is located 535 km (332 mi) south west from the state capital, Chennai and 72 km (45 mi) from Coimbatore.It is the headquarters of Udumalaipettai taluk and had a population of 61,133 as per 2011 Census of India. The town comes under the Udumalaipettai Assembly constituency.

== History ==
The municipality was established in 1918 and upgraded to second grade municipality in 1970. It was declared as a first grade municipality in 1979 and further upgrades to selection grade municipality in 1984. The extent of the municipality is 7.41 km^{2} of which 6.582 km^{2} is urban and 0.828 km^{2} is rural. It was part of Coimbatore district until 2008 when it became part of the newly formed Tiruppur district, a change which was opposed by the residents.

== Geography ==
The town is surrounded by Western Ghats on three sides. The average altitude of the town is 1208 feet above MSL. The topography is undulated and the general slope is from west to North. The town gets major rainfall during the South West monsoon. The average annual rainfall is 501.40 mm. Black and red soil types are found in the town containing alumina and gypsum. While black soil area is utilized for agriculture, the areas with red soil have more urbanized uses.

== Demographics ==
Religious census
Religion	Percent(%)
Hindu	81.83%
Muslim	14.49%
Christian	3.19%
Other	0.48%

According to 2011 census, Udumalaipettai had a population of 61,133 with a sex-ratio of 1,041 females for every 1,000 males, much above the national average of 929. A total of 4,939 were under the age of six, constituting 2,489 males and 2,450 females. Scheduled Castes and Scheduled Tribes accounted for 8.67% and 0.07% of the population respectively. The average literacy of the town was 83.85%, compared to the national average of 72.99%. The town had a total of 17,132 households. There were a total of 24,756 workers, comprising 226 cultivators, 289 main agricultural laborers, 450 in house hold industries, 21,403 other workers, 2,388 marginal workers, 51 marginal cultivators, 70 marginal agricultural laborers, 46 marginal workers in household industries and 2,221 other marginal workers. As per the religious census of 2011, Udumalaipettai had 81.83% Hindus, 14.49% Muslims, 3.19% Christians, 0.01% Sikhs, 0.01% Buddhists and 0.46% following other religions.

== Education ==
There are about fifteen higher secondary schools and a few of Arts and Science colleges. The Sri GVG Visalakshi College for Women established in 1952, is a women's general degree college that provides different courses in Arts, Science and Humanities. Government runs Higher Secondary Schools along with other private schools. Sainik school run by The Sainik Schools Society, an organization under the Ministry of Defence, is located in Amaravathi Nagar, about 15 kilometres from the town. In March 2019, the Union Council of Ministers approved for establishing a Kendriya Vidyalaya in the town.

== Economy ==
The economy of Udumalpet and its surroundings is mainly based on agriculture and textile industry. Main crops cultivated in this area are coconut, maize, millet, sugarcane, and paddy. Sizeable number of farmers also engage in dairy and poultry farming. The town, in the 1980s and 1990s, had a developed spinning industry but it has since declined due to automated micro and small textile industries which provides employment. There are windmill farms near the town because of the location of the town across the Palghat Gap.

== Transport ==
Udumalpet is well connected with nearby towns by highways and major district roads. NH-209 connecting Dindigul with Coimbatore runs through the city. Udumalpet is connected by government and private run bus services with major towns. The total length of roads, streets within municipality limits are about at 83.022 km. Consisting of 8.983 km of concrete road, 47,772 km of B.T roads and 26.627 km of other types of roads. The street pattern within the town is generally narrow. About 83.022 km of roads are within the municipal area and about 9.0 km belonging to the category of Major District Roads and National Highways.

The town is located in the Pollachi - Dindigul broad gauge section of the Indian Railways. Coimbatore International Airport (70 km) is the nearest airport to the town.

== Places of interest ==
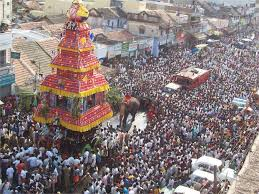
Sri Mariamman Temple car festival

The town is surrounded by Western Ghats and has a moderate weather throughout the year. Places of interest include Thirumoorthy hills with Thirumoorthy temple (Amanalingeswarar temple) and Thirumoorthy dam, Panchalingam falls, Amaravathi Dam with a crocodile farm and Anamalai Tiger Reserve.
