= Kukkal =

Village in Tamil Nadu, India

Kookal is a Panchayat village of terrace farmers at the far western end of the Palani Hills in Kodaikanal block of Dindigul district, Tamil Nadu state, South India. It is 40 kilometres (25 mi) from Kodaikanal at: 10°17′9″N 77°21′48″E. Elevation is 1,890 metres (6,200 ft). Kookal is notable for the high biodiversity of the area.

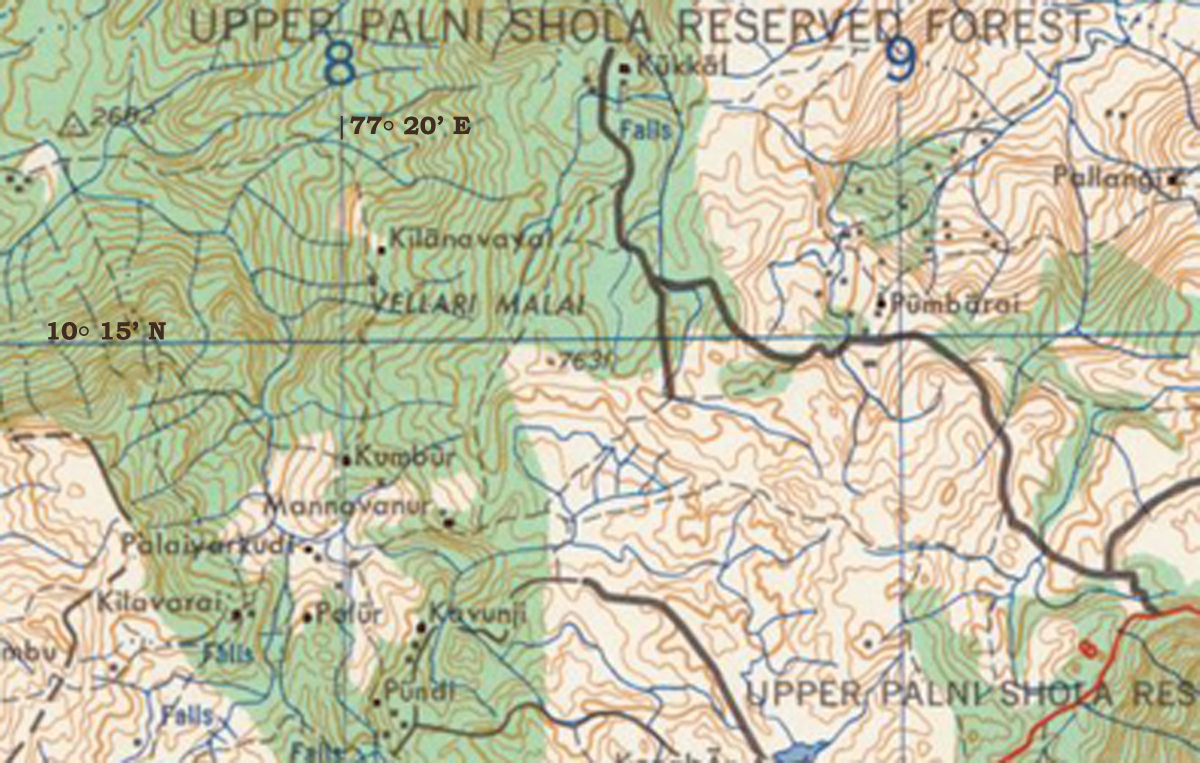
Upper Palani Reserve Forest showing Kookal

== Geography ==
Kookal sits at the head of the 126 square kilometres (49 sq mi) Kudiraiyar River basin. In this hilly terrain, topography may account for large variations in rainfall over short distances. A rain gauge at the border of the Kookal forest at 2,000 metres (6,600 ft) recorded rainfall about 50% higher than that of two rain gauges in grasslands at the same altitude and northern slope during 1956–1966.

== Employment ==
Out of 392 households reporting income, the means of livelihood are: casual labour 149, subsistence cultivation 183, artisan 32, salary 14. other 14. 33 cookkal 149 183 32 14 14 0 392

== Health ==
Drinking water for 391 households is supplied from a source: greater than elevation of 100 meter - 13, within Elevation of 50-100 meter - 149, within Elevation of less than 50 meters -127, within House - 102. within an elevation of more than 50 meters. There is a lack of sanitary latrine facilities. Out of a total of 392 homes: 291 use open defection, 44 use a group latrine with regular water supply, 22 use group latrine with regular water supply, 2 use a clean group latrine with regular water supply and a regular sweeper and 33 use a private latrine.

== Education ==
There is a Panchayat Union primary school here. Out of 392 children 5–14 years old, 204 are working and not going to school, 7 are going to school and working, 176 are going to school and not working and 5 no response. Household literacy rate is 79%.

== Wildlife ==
The area includes four types of ecosystems — swamp, grassland, freshwater lake and shola. Kookal lake runs through the middle of the sholas and surrounding grasslands. The Sálim Ali Centre for Ornithology and Natural History has a field research station here.

Flora

The Southern Montane Wet Temperate Forest has some unique features. An enormous 800-year-old tree, (sp.?) which bears fruit said to be useful for patients with diabetes and high blood pressure, is found here. It is now fenced in and under the care of the Tamil Nadu Forest Department. Very rare single fern trees, jamun and rudraksha trees, 26 species of cinnamon and the Shenbagam flower tree highlight the plant biodiversity.

Evergreen rain forest once extended down the valleys and slopes of the Palani Hills almost to the plains. One relatively large patch of evergreen forest survives on the north-west edge of the Palani plateau west of the settlement of Kookal. It lies on the flanks and crest of a north–south ridge and is mostly between 2,000 metres (6,600 ft) and 2,100 metres (6,900 ft) elevation. There is also a stunted dry woodland on parts of the ridge crest. Beyond the forest is the most extensive remaining montane grassland wilderness of the Palani Hills, merging with Manjampatti Valley in the Indira Gandhi National Park.

Woody plants were inventoried in December 2004 in the Kookal Reserve Forest. A total of 2279 stems belonging to 83 species, 68 genera and 40 families were inventoried. Of these, 16 species from 12 genera and 12 families were lianas. The most abundant species (≥ 1 cm dbh) was Psychotria nilgiriensis var. astephana (Rubiaceae), which accounted for 12% of the stems sampled. Xantolis tomentosa var. elengioides had the largest basal area. Lauraceae was the dominant family accounting for 20% of the stems. About 30% of the species were endemic to the Western Ghats.

The Sholas are shrinking and wildlife population are threatened due to monoculture plantations of the Introduced species pine, eucalyptus and wattle. Along with the encroaching trees, ground ferns are also eating into the grasslands, affecting both the flora and the fauna of the area. Kookal lake hosts a healthy otter population. The Kookal sholas are noted for 165 species of butterflies, and a number of relatively uncommon birds such as the wood pigeon, Nilgiri pipit and 15 types of dabchicks.

== Trekking ==
Many of these wilderness areas and various wildlife may be seen while trekking in the area of Kookal. It is not safe to trek in the area without a local guide.

- The Kookal caves, at about: 10°19′17″N 77°19′54″E, are ancient rock shelters that show traces of and are believed to be home to the descendants of the original Palaiyar (meaning "old ones") tribes who used to wear leaf clothing. The caves are overhanging slabs of different types of metamorphic rocks called charconite and granulite. Till the mid-1980s, over 30 families resided on the hill top, where a small temple is located.

To reach Kookal Caves, travel by bus from Kodaikanal to Poombarai and begin walking northwest. After walking through geranium plantations, and pine and wattle forest, the Kookal Forest Rest house can he reached. From there is a 8 kilometres (5.0 mi) trail to the Kookal natural rock cave formations on a hill top. This stretch is leech-infested and best avoided during the monsoon.,.

- Kookal - Kudiraiyar Dam - Palani: This is a difficult hike. Though the distance is only 13 kilometres (8.1 mi) a good hiker will take about 5 hours. From Kookal, follow the foot-path leading to Pappampatti. After three kilometers this crosses the Kudiraiyar River and continues along the river. A waterfall 90 metres (300 ft) high can be heard to the left. Elephants are common here. You'll walk through sholas, and deciduous forest. On getting to Kudiraiyar Dam, take a bus to Palani and back to Kodaikanal.
- There is a trekking route from Mannavanur via Keelanavayal (90 mins.) to ManjampattI (3 hours) and Thalinji (2 hours) then to SH 17 (1 hr) and bus to Udumalaipettai.
- Another route is from Paricombai - Kookal (8 km) - Kuthirayar-Pappanpatty-Kavalapatty (7 hours) then bus to Palani.
- Mannavanur is about an hour's drive from Kodaikanal. Some popular trekking routes pass through the Sheep Research Center. The route from Kavunji to Kookal is fairly difficult.

From Kavunji take the footpath leading to Mannavanur. From there an old footpath leads to the sheep farm. Cross it and reach the Kodaikanal road. Follow the road to Kookal. En route, there are pleasant meadows of the sheep farm. Above Kookal you can see the caves where ancient men were living. Deer are common.

== Visitor information ==
Tourists are required to get permission from the Forest Department to visit Kookal or trek in the forest areas. Please contact: Government of Tamil Nadu, Tourist Office, Annasalai, Kodaikanal, 624 101, Tamil Nadu, India. PH; 04542- 241675. A trekking map is available from them. Bison Wells Lodge has a panoramic view of the eastern slopes of Kookal ridge.
