= Kumbur =

(This is not Kumboor Village, Kumboor Post, Via Madapur, Karnataka, India.)

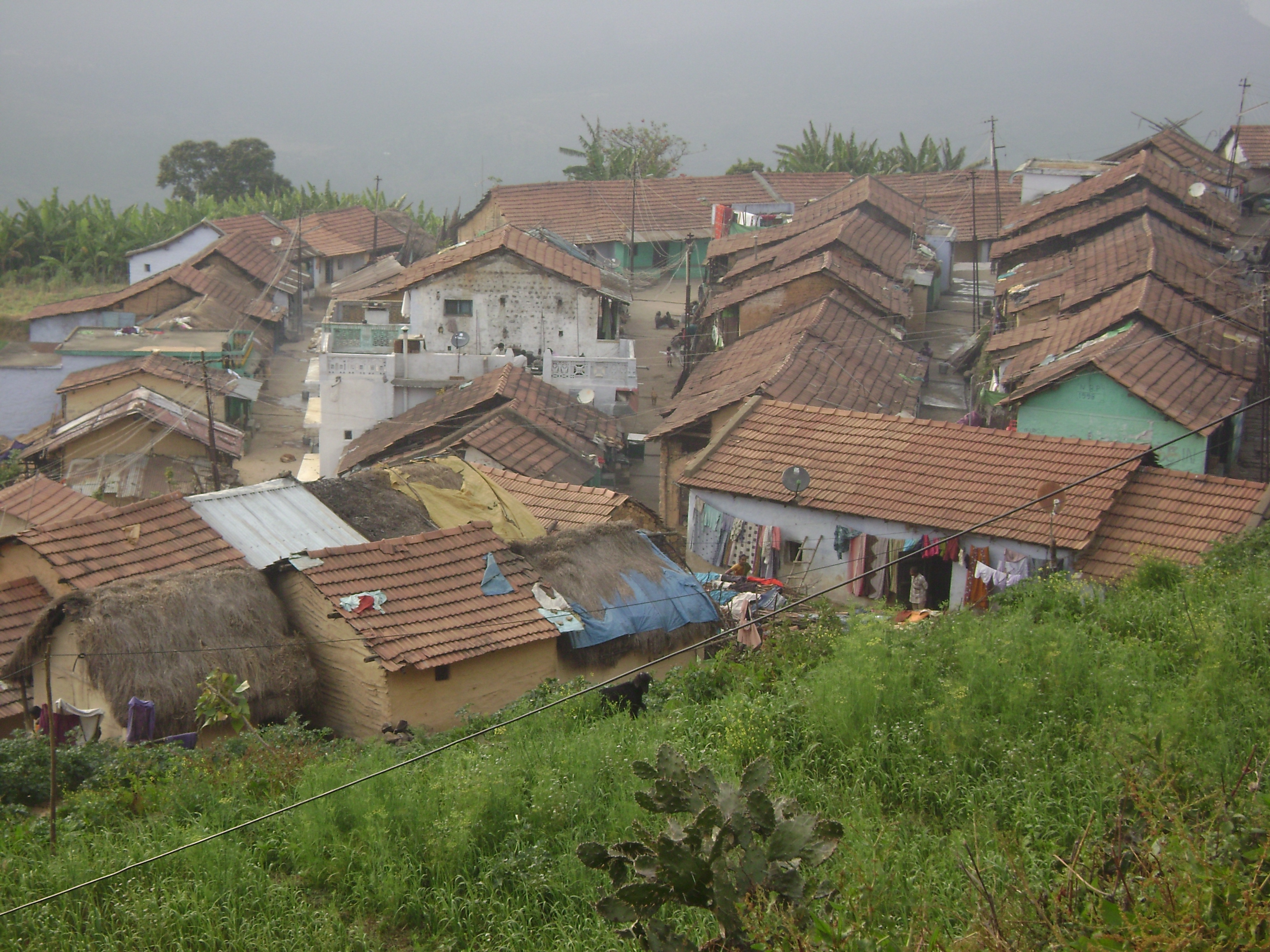
Houses of Kumbur Village

Kumbur (Koombur, Kumboor), is a farming village of 202 houses in Mannavanur Panchayat, at the end of the road 42 kilometers (26 mi) west from Kodaikanal in Dindigul district, Tamil Nadu, India. It is at the head of the Kumbur River in Manjampatti Valley drainage basin. Altitude is 1,768 meters (5,801 ft) 10°13.45′N 77°20′E

== Employment ==
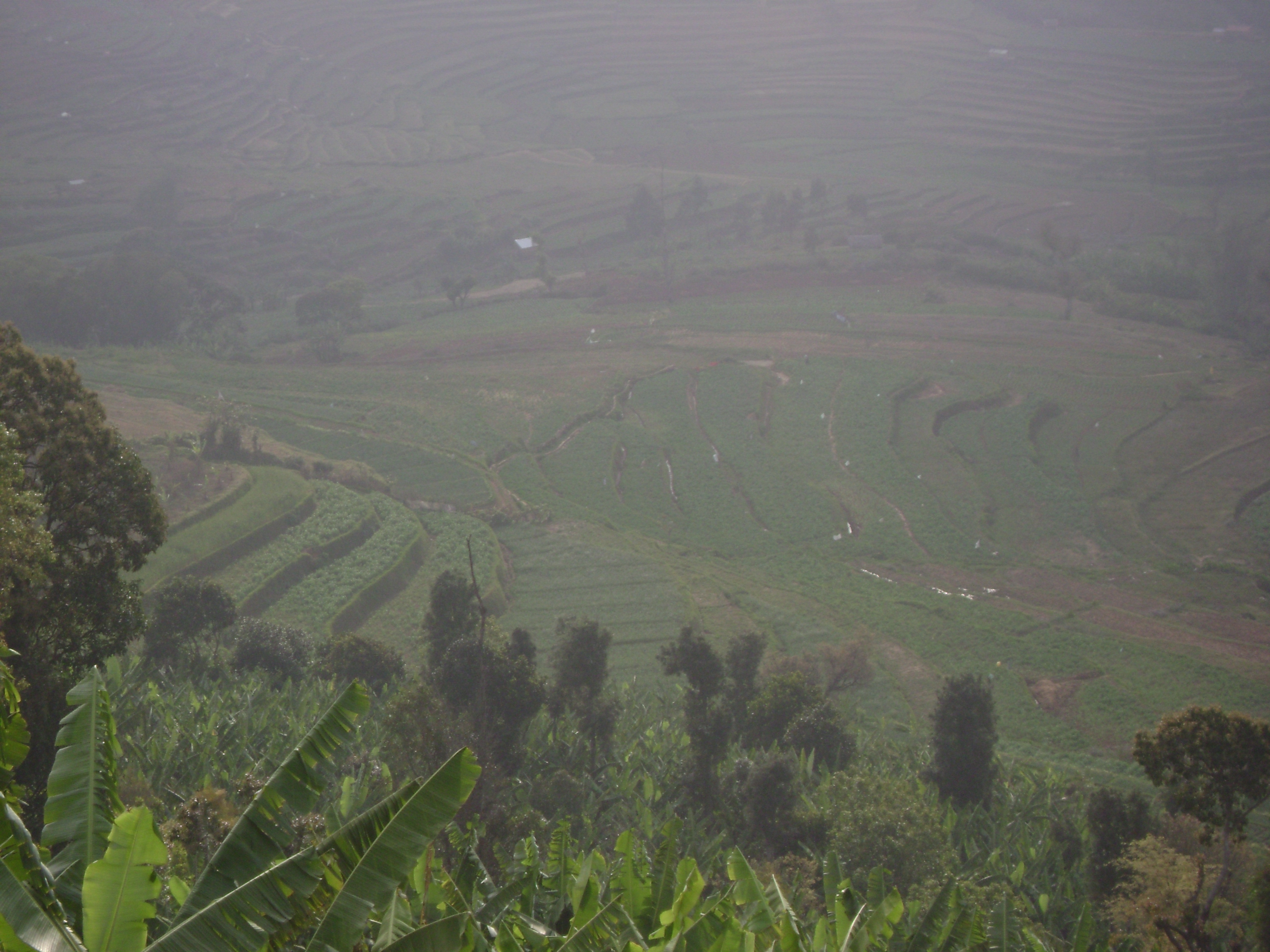
Terrace Farming at Kumbur

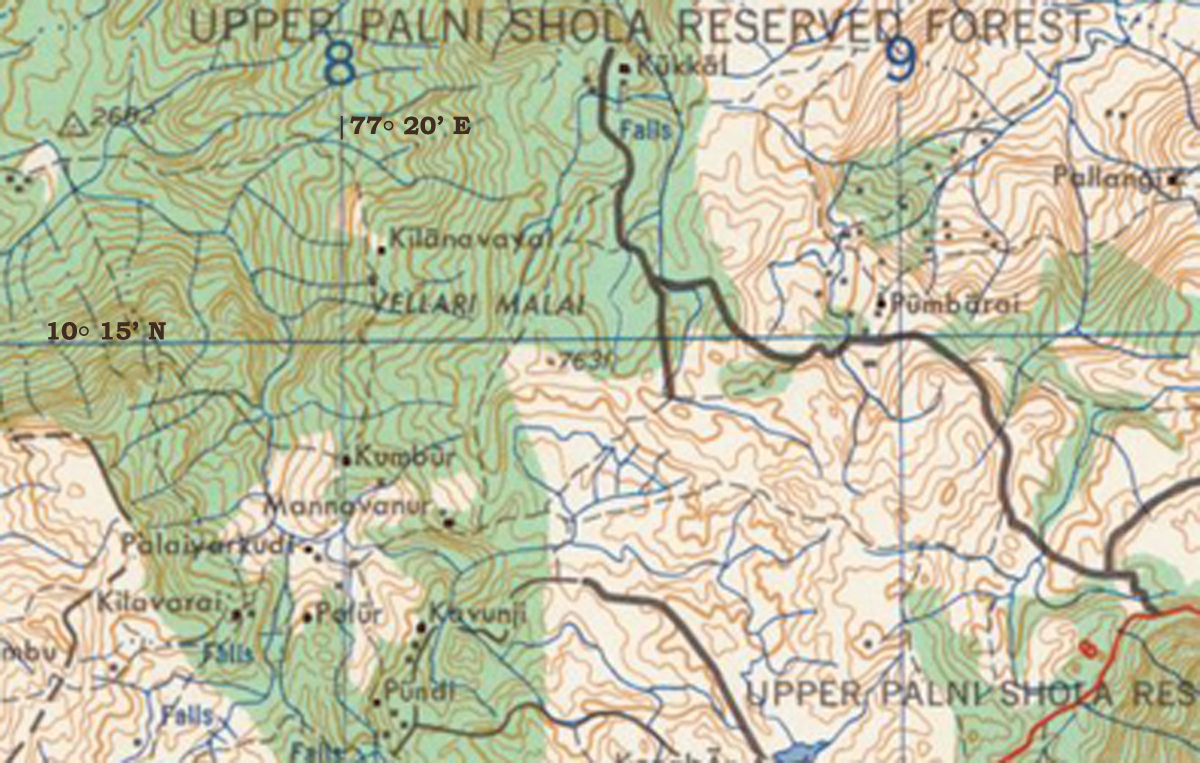
Upper Palani Reserve Forest showing Kumbur

There are about 500 Chettiar and Asari residents, most of whom are farmers and laborers growing potatoes, carrots, cabbage and garlic. Out of 245 households reporting income, the means of livelihood are: casual labour 91, subsistence cultivation 61, artisan 92 and salary 1. Some of the inhabitants work in Kodaikanal and have regular income.

== Health ==
There is a paramedical visit once per month and villagers have the opportunity to visit a medical clinic in Mannavanor 7 km away by road. Clean drinking water is supplied by a piping system from a deep underground source with 179 households supplied from the source within an elevation of less than 50 meters and 63 households supplied from the source greater than 50 meters. There is a lack of sanitary latrine facilities., Out of a total of 245 homes: 155 use open defection and 90 use a group latrine with regular water supply.

== Education ==
There are 4 primary schools and 1 upper primary school, (See photo of a one teacher school in Kumboor Village. The venue is a village Chawadi (market).) There are 245 children 5–14 years old, of whom 152 are working and not going to school, 75 are going to school and working and 18 are going to school and not working.
