= Kilanavayal =

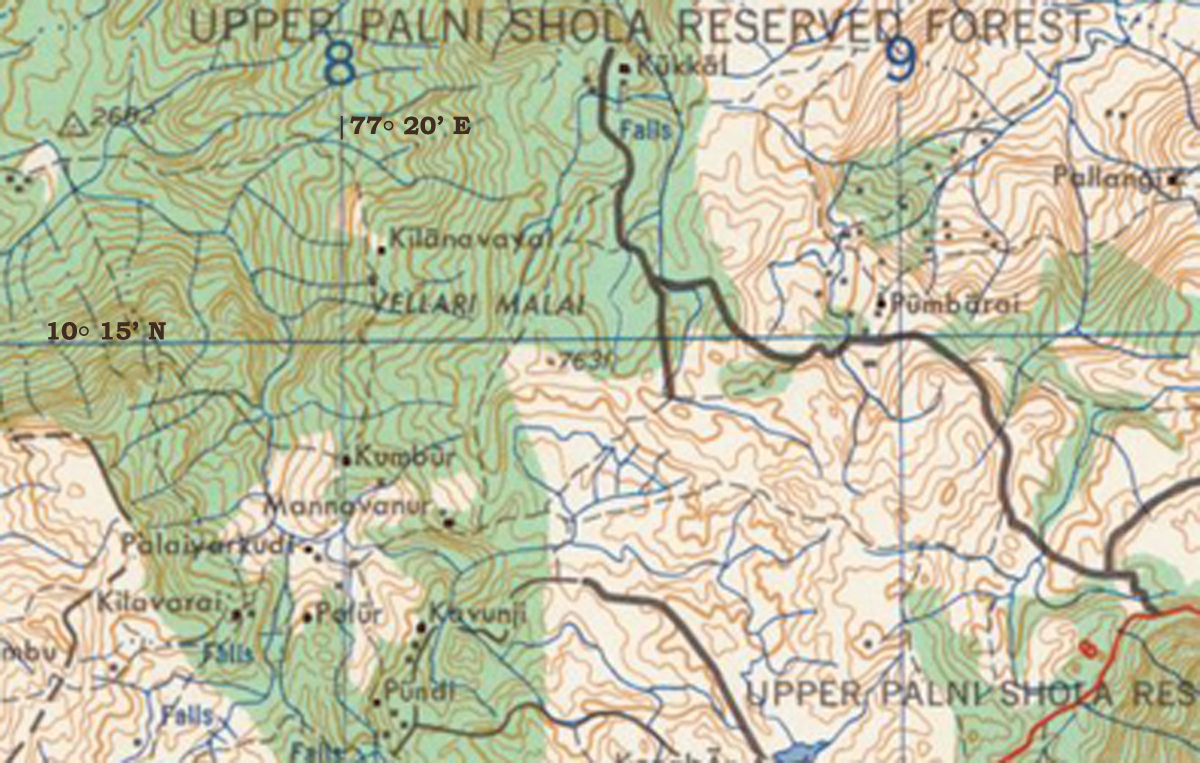
Upper Palani Reserve Forest showing Kilanavayal

Kilanavayal (Keelanavayal) is a small village of terrace farmers in Mannavanur panchayat at the far eastern end of the Manjampatti Valley drainage basin in the Palani Hills. There is a 9 kilometers (5.6 mi) road between Mannavanur and Kilanavayal. There is a trekking route from Mannavanur via Keelanavayal (90 mins.) to ManjampattI (3 hours) and Thalinji (2 hours). It is in Kodaikanal block of Dindigul district, Tamil Nadu state, India. Altitude is 1,755 meters (5,758 ft) at: 10°15′53″N 77°19′40″E.

== Employment ==
Out of 124 households reporting income, the means of livelihood are: casual labour 37, sub sistence cultivation 31, artisan 56, salary 3.

== Health ==
Drinking water for 124 households is supplied from a source within an elevation of more than 50 meters, while water for 99 households is from less than 50 meters. There is a lack of sanitary latrine facilities. Out of a total of 124 homes: 67 use open defection, 54 use a group latrine with regular water supply, none use a clean group latrine with regular water supply and a regular sweeper and only 3 use a private latrine.

== Education ==
There is a Panchayat Union upper primary school here. Out of 124 children 5–14 years old, 67 are working and not going to school, 56 are going to school and working and 1 is going to school and not working. Household literacy rate is 70%.
