= Sheep Research Center (Mannavanur) =

Speech and wool research center in Mannavanur

Coordinates: 10°13′26″N 77°21′6″E

Southern Regional Research Centre (SRRC) is a regional centre of the Central Sheep & Wool Research Institute (CSWRI), a premier Institution of the Indian Council of Agricultural Research (I.C.A.R), New Delhi. The SRRC was founded on 16 November 1965 and has been active for over 45 years at Mannavanur. The centre was created in 1965 by former Agriculture Minister, Shri C. Subramaniam. It is located 30 km away from Kodaikanal. This centre is the animal science research centre under ICAR for both Tamil Nadu and Kerala states. It is located in Mannavanur village, Dindigul district in the Indian state of Tamil Naduon 1,340 acres (5.4 km^{2}) of rolling grassland at altitude 2,000 metres (6,600 ft).

The centre breeds sheep and rabbits for wool and meat, including Angora, Chinchilla, White giant and others.

The site is one of the last extensive chunks of high altitude grassland left in the Palani Hills. Others have been taken over by Eucalyptus, Wattle and other plantations. Spotted deer, gaur, wild dogs, sambar and other animals are regular visitors to the campus. The small lake within it has common carp, mirror carp and otters.

== Research ==
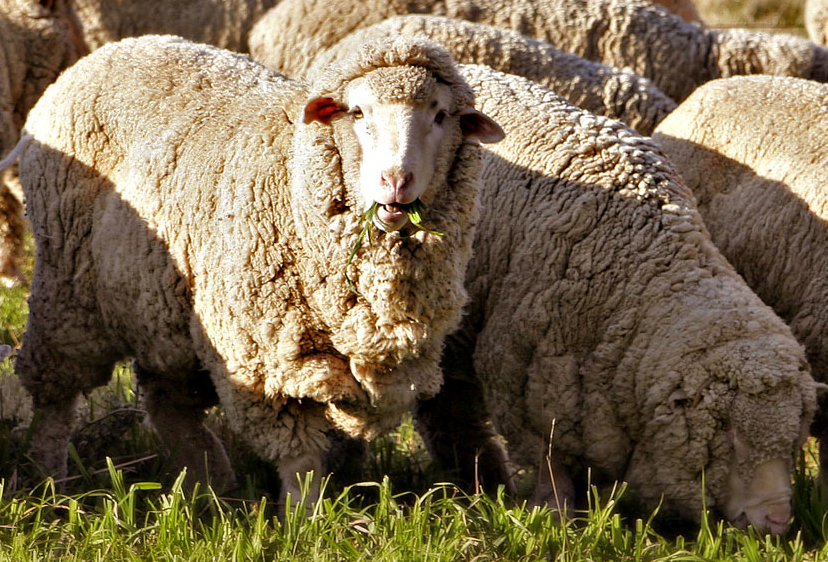
Full wool Merino sheep

The mandate of the centre is to:

- Undertake basic and applied research on all aspects of sheep and rabbit production.
- Develop, update and standardize meat, fibre and pelt technologies.
- Educate about sheep and rabbit production and utilization.
- Transfer improved technologies to farmers, rural artisans and development workers.
- Provide referral and consultation services.

Scientific research at the centre targets:

- Performance evaluation of Broiler and Angora rabbits in field conditions
- Demonstration unit for Bharat Merino and Avikalin sheep
- Operational research project on technology transfer

They employ 5 full-time scientists (Agricultural Research Scientists) and 3 technical officers.
