= Mannavanur =

- village
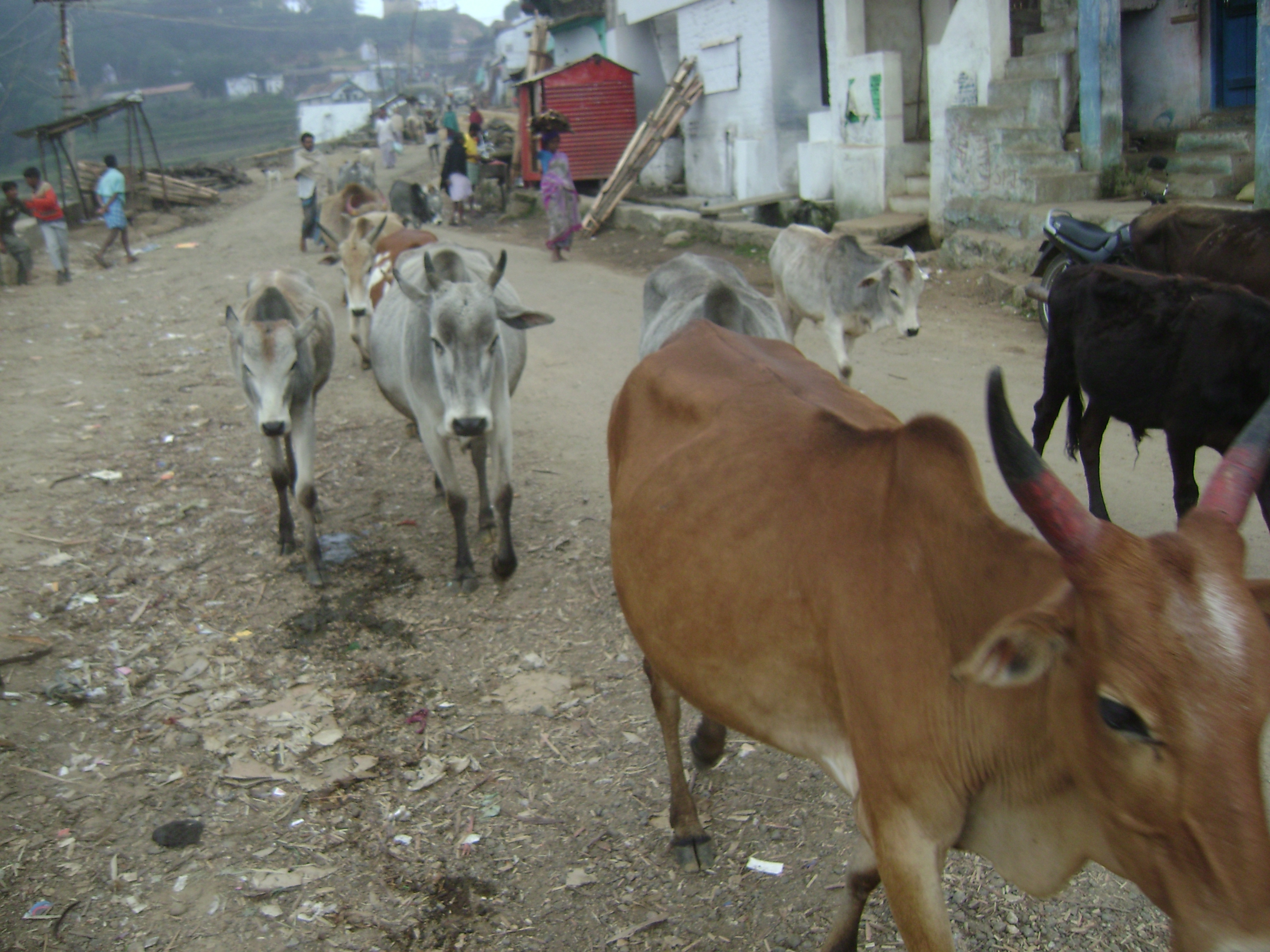
- Mannavanur street scene

- Location in Tamil Nadu, India Mannavanur (India)
- Coordinates: 10°14′0″N 77°20′0″E
- Country: India
- State: Tamil Nadu
- District: Dindigul
- Talukas: Kodaikanal
- Elevation: 1,880 m (6,170 ft)

Population (2001)
  - Total: 5,927

Languages
  - Official: Tamil
- Time zone: UTC+5:30 (IST)
- Literacy: 75% %

Mannavanur (Mannavanor, Mannavannur), is a farming village of 1437 households in Mannavanor Panchayat, Dindigul district, Tamil Nadu, India, 35 kilometres (22 mi) west from Kodaikanal It is 7 kilometres (4 mi) by road from Kumbur village and 9 kilometres (6 mi) from Kilanavayal village. Altitude is 1,880 metres (6,170 ft).

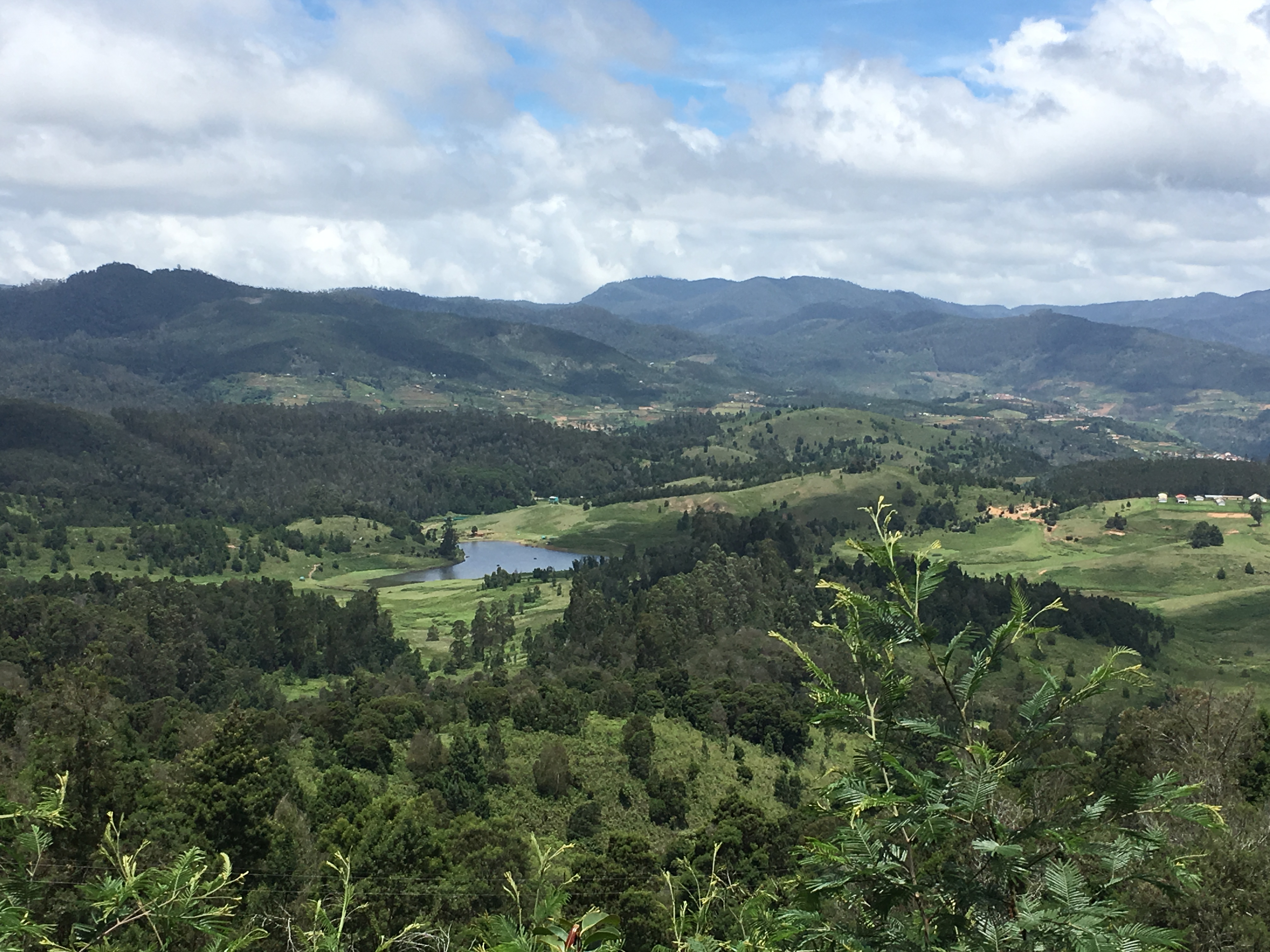
View of Mannavanur. Mannavanur Lake in the center

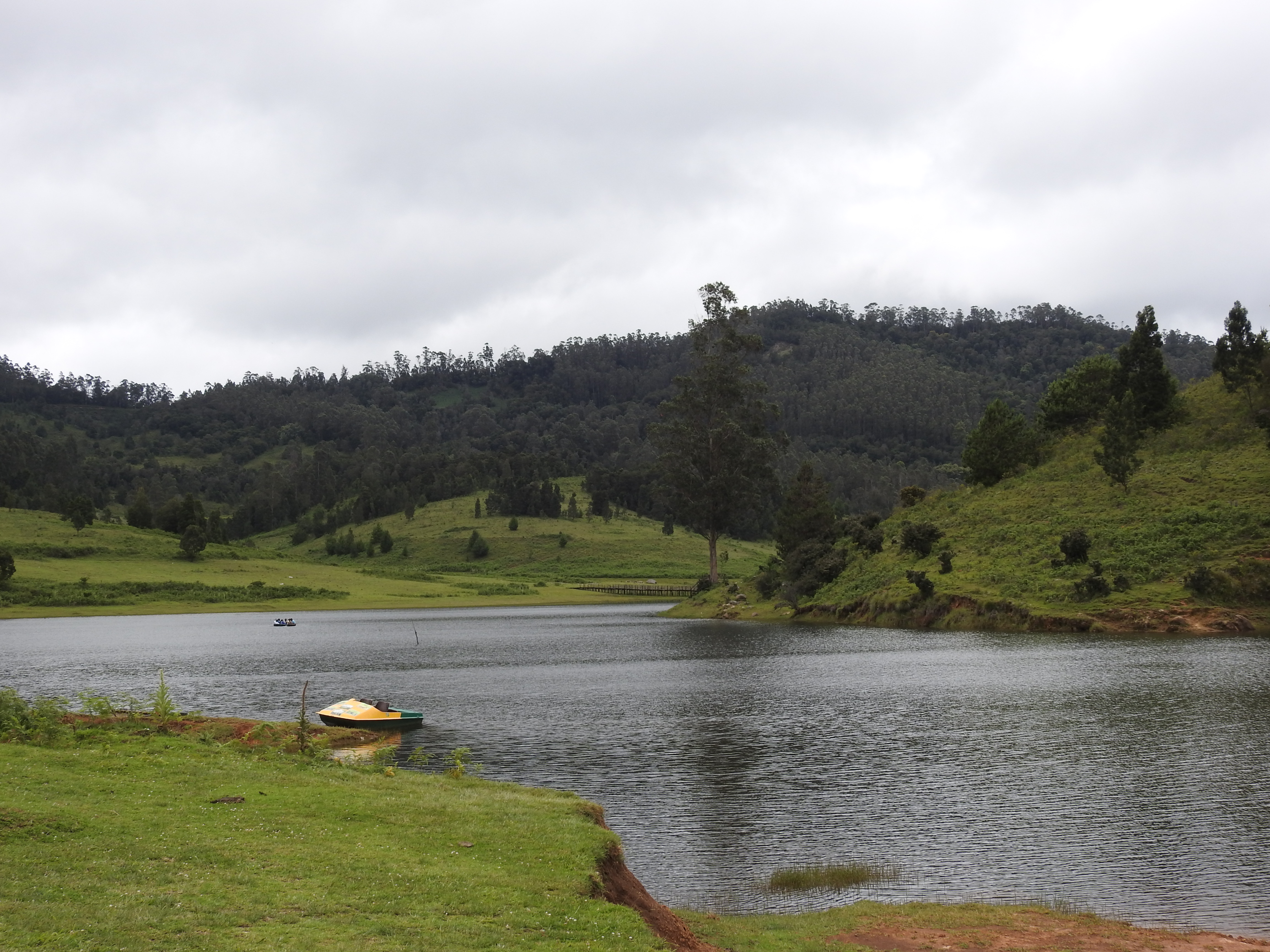
Mannavanur Lake

== Employment ==
There are 2,980 males and 2,947 females, most of whom are terrace farmers and agricultural laborers growing potatoes, broccoli, French beans, butter beans, carrots, cauliflower, peas, cabbage and garlic. Out of 569 households reporting income, the means of livelihood are: casual labour 279, subsistence cultivation 21, artisan 265, salary 3, and others 1.

The Central Sheep and Wool Research Institution Sheep Research Center employs four full-time scientists and three technical officers. There is a Branch of the Punjab National Bank near the Research Center building. It caters to all the financial needs of the surrounding villages of Mannavanur, Kumbur, Keelanavyil, Kavunji, Poondi, Polur and Kilavarai (on the Kerala border).

== Health ==
There is a medical clinic in Mannavanur. Drinking water for most households is supplied from a source within an elevation of less than 100 meters.

== Education ==
Education has improved in the village all students are studying in Mannavanur and out of station also. There are 2 Panchayat Union Primary School and 2 Panchayat Union Middle Schools, (See photos of one teacher schools in Mannavanor Village. The venue is outdoors.)

== Wildlife ==
Bison, sambar, barking deer, Nilgiri langur, Nilgiri tahr and jungle cats are sighted here. The place is also known for its 165 species of butterflies, 15 types of dabchicks, wood pigeon and the Nilgiri pipit.

== Visitor information ==
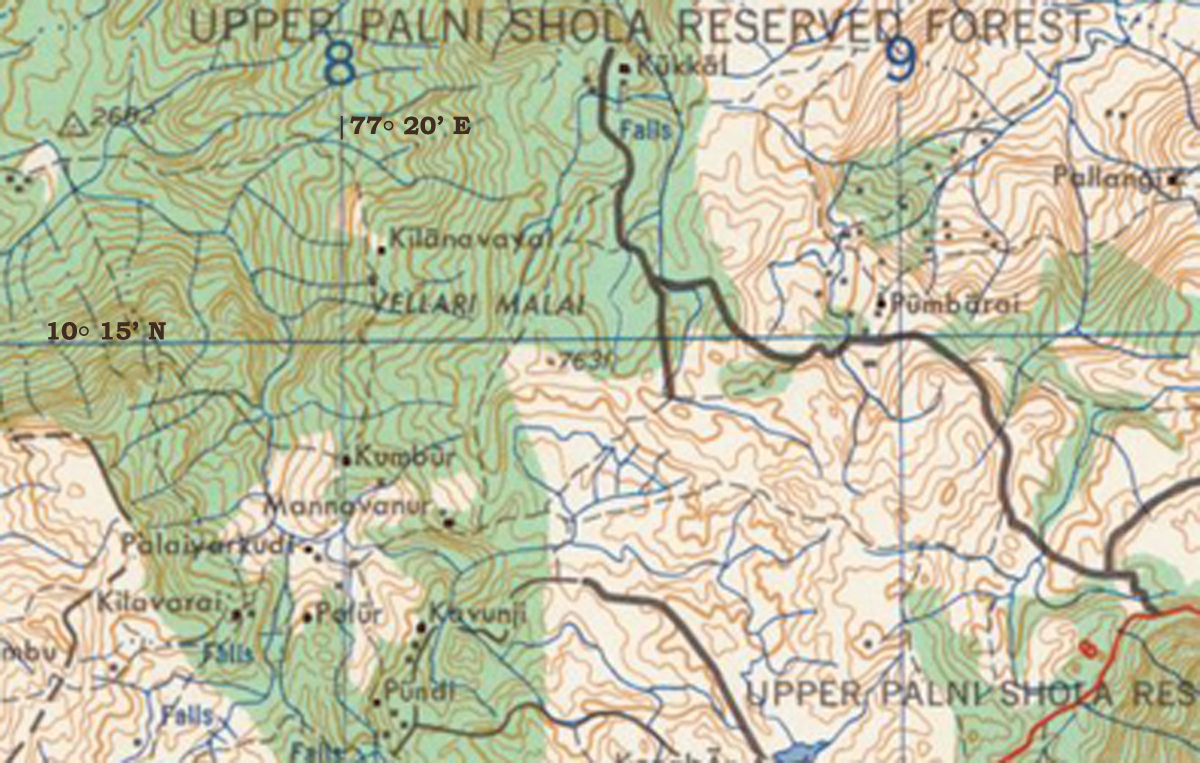
Upper Palani Reserve Forest showing Mannavanur

Mannavanur is about an hour’s drive from Kodaikanal. Some popular trekking routes pass through the Sheep Center. The route from Kavunji to Kuukkal is fairly difficult.

From Kavunji take a footpath leading to Mannavanur. From there an old footpath leads to the sheep farm. Cross it and reach the Kodaikkanal road. Follow the road to Kukkal. Enroute, the meadows of sheep farm is pleasant. Near Kukkal you see the caves where ancient men were living. Deer are common.

Tourists are required to get permission from the Forest Department to trek in the forest areas. Please contact : Government of Tamil Nadu, Tourist Office, Annasalai, Kodaikanal, PH; 04542- 241675. A trekking map is available from them.

Nature's Trust has set up a base camp called Camper's Club on a 26-acre (11 ha) plot. There are eight small cottages with basic facilities. It organises educational tours and treks (there are 21 routes). They offer a short course in eco-technology and training in clay modelling, homemade chocolates, dry flower arrangements and natural dye painting on T-shirts.

The Camper's Club is the only accommodation available in Mannavannur. For prior booking, contact D1, Saibaba Colony, No.1 Kannagai Street, East Tambaram, Chennai. Ph.: 94444-77358.

Visitors to the Sheep Research Center should first see the officer-in-charge at the main office building. Educational institutions can get permission from the officer-in-charge for small groups to camp overnight.
