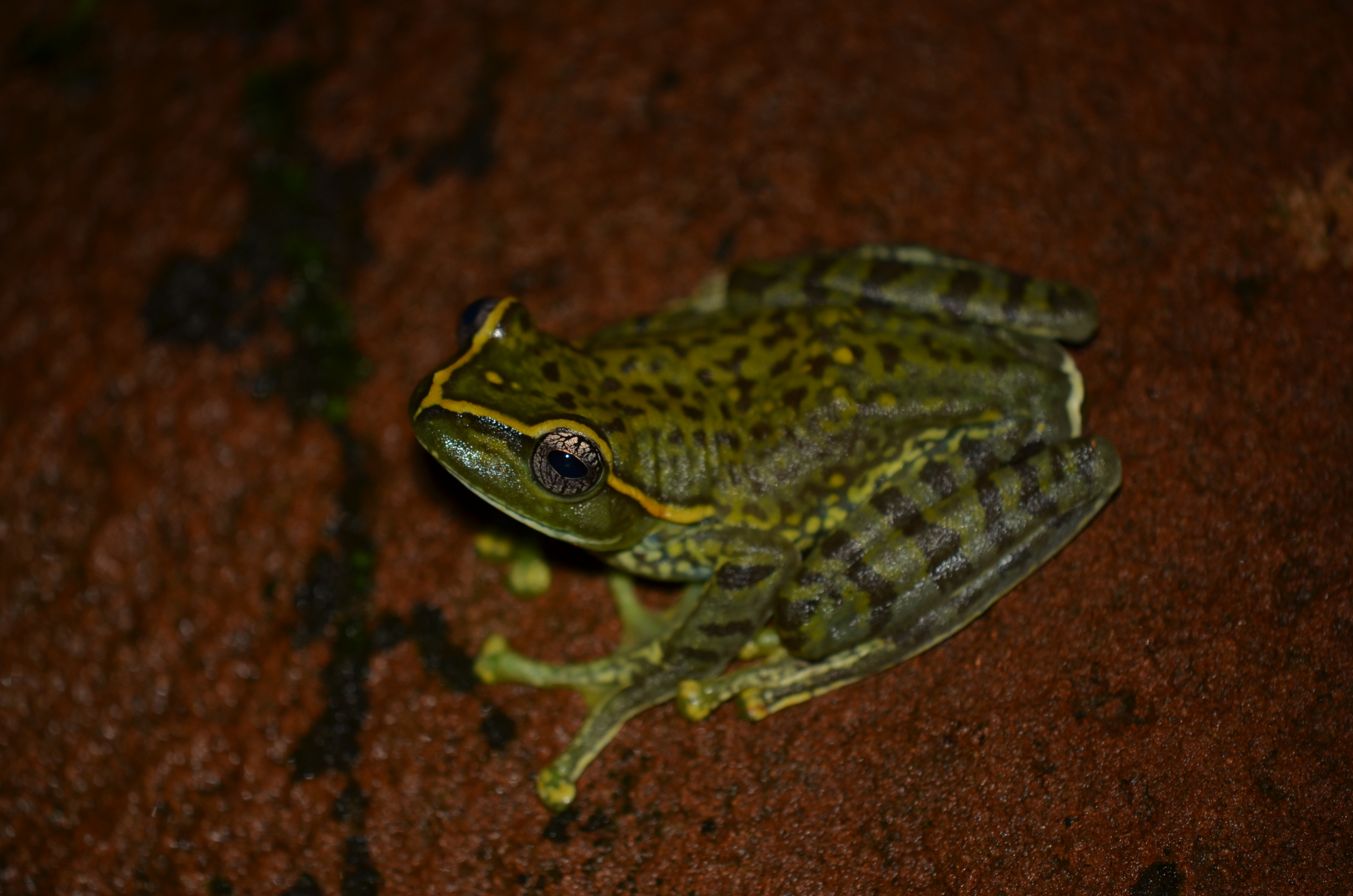

Conservation status
- Vulnerable (IUCN 3.1)

Scientific classification
- Kingdom: Animalia
- Phylum: Chordata
- Class: Amphibia
- Order: Anura
- Family: Rhacophoridae
- Genus: Ghatixalus
- Species: G. magnus

Binomial name
- Ghatixalus magnus Abraham, Mathew, Cyriac, Zachariah, Raju, and Zachariah, 2015

= Ghatixalus magnus =

Species of frog

Ghatixalus magnus, the large-sized Ghat tree frog, is a species of frog in the subfamily Rhacophorinae. It is endemic to India, in the southern Western Ghat mountains, between the Palakkad Gap and Shencottah Gap.

== Appearance ==
G. magnus may be the largest known rhacophorid frog in India.

Scientists described two male frogs, one 71.54 mm long in snout-vent length and the other 81.90 mm long. The skin of the dorsum is rusty yellow in color with small brighter yellow spots. The sides of the body are dark brown with white lines and purple-blue spots where the back legs meet the body. The tympanum is yellow. There is a bright yellow stripe down each side of the snout. The iris is purple-gray in color with black venation. There are dark brown crossbars on the legs. The feet are turquoise blue with blue-brown webbed skin and yellow disks on the toes.

Except for its size, G. magnus resembles G. variabilis and G. asterops relatively closely. The larvae, however, differ significantly. G. variabilis and G. asterops tadpoles swim in rocky streams and have large oral suckers to allow them to adhere to surfaces despite strong water flow. G. magnus tadpoles, however, swim in stream pools during the summer, when the current is slower. Although the tadpoles do have a "large oral appendage" on their mouths, scientists do not believe they use it to anchor themselves. G. magnus tadpoles also havethe greatest number of rows of teeth of any frog tadpole in Rhacophoridae: from 7/6 to 10/10. The rhacophorid average is 5/3.

The tadpoles undergo metamorphosis in May.

== Habitat ==
People have observed this frog in rainforests on mid-elevation mountains and nearby coffee farms. This frog can live near cascades, where it perches on boulders and large rocks. People have observed this frog between 1350 and 1800 meters above sea level.

The frog's range includes protected parks: Anamalai Tiger Reserve, Periyar Tiger Reserve, Eravikulam National Park, Indira Gandhi Wildlife Sanctuary, Devermala in Achankovil Reserve Forests, and Meghamalai Wildlife Sanctuary. Scientists think that about half of all the living G. magnus frogs live in these places.

== Threats ==
Scientists classify this frog as vulnerable to extinction because of habitat loss associated with deforestation for road-building and agriculture, especially cash crops, but also illegal farming and tree harvesting and small-scale traditional farming. The frog can live on some types of farms, such as coffee plantations, but cannot tolerate the full opening up of its habitat or removal of leaf litter associated with ginger farming or traditional farming. These involve the removal of the understory and leaf litter that the frog needs to lay its eggs.

Scientists also cite climate change as a threat to this frog because its mountain habitat would make migration very difficult.

Scientists have observed the fungus Batrachochytrium dendrobatidis on some of these frogs, but they have not observed morbidity or mortality associated with the fungal disease chytridiomycosis.

== Etymology ==
This frog's Latin name means "great," referring to its large size relative to its congeners.
