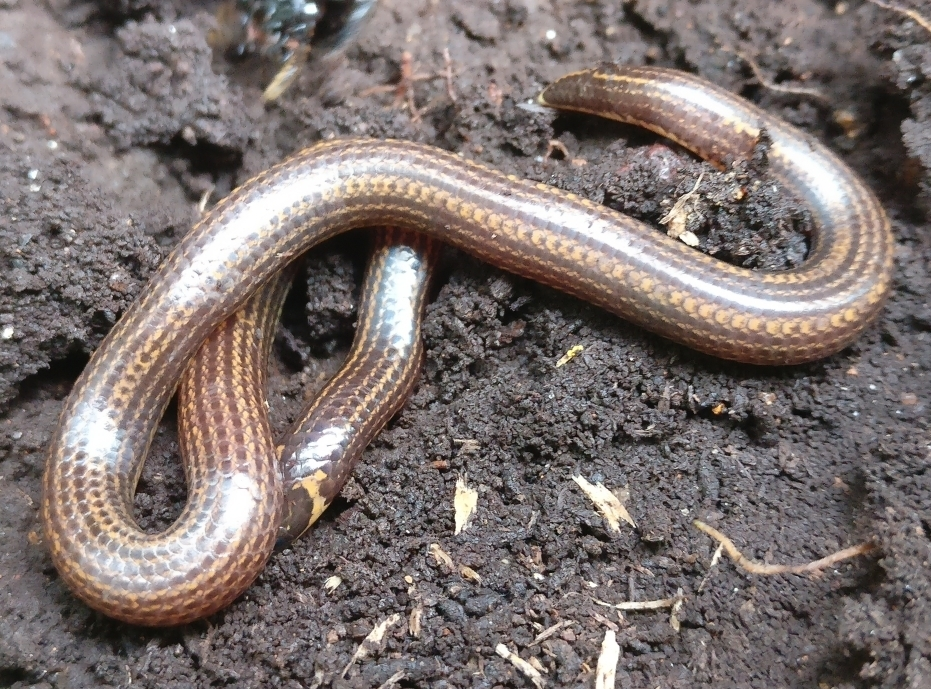
- Platyplectrurus madurensis

Scientific classification
- Kingdom: Animalia
- Phylum: Chordata
- Class: Reptilia
- Order: Squamata
- Suborder: Serpentes
- Family: Uropeltidae
- Genus: Platyplectrurus; Günther, 1868

Synonyms
- Wallia F. Werner, 1925

= Platyplectrurus =

Genus of snakes

Common name: Thorntail snakes

Platyplectrurus is a genus of nonvenomous shield tail snakes endemic to the Western Ghats of India. Currently, two species are recognized.

== Geographic range ==
Found in the Western Ghats of South India. Found in high elevation (> 1200 m asl) montane Shola forests, under rocks, fallen logs and in piles of debris.

== Species ==
| Species | Taxon author | Subsp.* | Common name | Geographic range |
|---|---|---|---|---|
| Platyplectrurus madurensis | Beddome, 1877 | 1 | Travancore Hills thorntail snake | South India (the Western Ghats in the Palnai and Travancore Hills) |
| Platyplectrurus trilineatus^{T} | (Beddome, 1867) | 0 | lined thorntail snake | South India in the Western Ghats: Anaimalai in (Kerala) |

- ) Not including the nominate subspecies

^{T}) Type species
