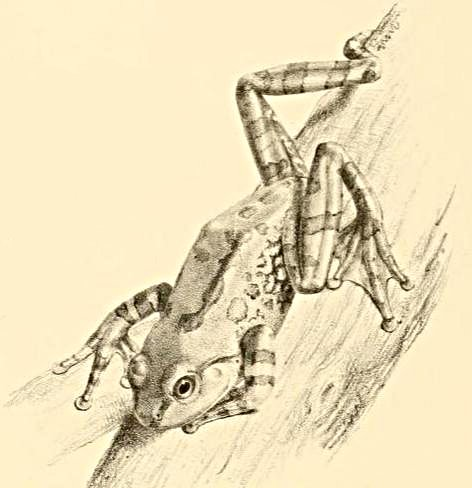
- Ghatixalus variabilis

Scientific classification
- Kingdom: Animalia
- Phylum: Chordata
- Class: Amphibia
- Order: Anura
- Family: Rhacophoridae
- Subfamily: Rhacophorinae
- Genus: Ghatixalus; Biju, Roelants, and Bossuyt, 2008

Type species
- Polypedates variabilis Jerdon, 1854

Species
- 3, see text

= Ghatixalus =

Genus of amphibians

Ghatixalus is a genus of frogs in the family Rhacophoridae, subfamily Rhacophorinae. They are endemic to the Western Ghats of southern India. They are the sister taxon to a larger clade consisting of Chiromantis, Feihyla, Taruga, Polypedates, and Rhacophorus. The name of the genus combines words "Ghats" and "Ixalus". The former refers to the Western Ghats, and the latter to now-abandoned genus name that lives as the suffix in many generic names for rhacophorid frogs.

== Description ==
Ghatixalus are medium-to giant-sized frogs with adult males measuring 39–82 mm (1.5–3.2 in) and females 58–67 mm (2.3–2.6 in) adults (male SVL 38.8–82 mm, female 58.1–66.7 mm) in snout-vent length. They have a dorsal color pattern with dark brown prominent blotches. Eggs develop in foam nests followed by a free-swimming tadpole stage. Their habitat is associated with mountain streams throughout their life cycle.

== Distribution and natural history ==
This exclusively Shola forest specialist genus is distributed only in the high elevations of Nilgiris and Anaimalai-Palnis, only above 1600 m asl. Most of the sightings were near streams and streamside often on bare ground, grass clumps on ground or rocks nearby. Although belonging to rather arboreal frog family, these frogs are terrestrial animals.

== Species ==
There are only 3 recognized species in the genus Ghatixalus:

- Ghatixalus asterops Biju, Roelants, and Bossuyt, 2008 endemic to Upper Palni Hills, Anaimalai and High Ranges.
- Ghatixalus magnus Abraham, Mathew, Cyriac, Zachariah, Raju and Zachariah, 2015 endemic to the Anaimalai Hills, High Ranges, Cardamom Hills, Meghamalai and Pandalam Hills
- Ghatixalus variabilis (Jerdon, 1854) endemic to Upper Nilgiri Hills

The Palakkad Gap is believed to be a prominent biogeographic barrier that has caused speciation between the sister species G. asterops and G. variabilis.
