= Christer Norström =

Swedish social anthropologist

Christer Norström, born in 1952, is a Swedish social anthropologist whose research has focused on hunter-gatherer societies, indigenous peoples, environmental movements, and rural livelihoods in South India. He is known for his ethnographic work among the Paliyan people of the Palani Hills (Palni Hills) in the state of Tamil Nadu.

Beyond his work on the Paliyans, Norström has researched food production, food security, and agricultural change in South India, as well as the history and experiences of environmental activists in the region.

== Borneo 1981-1982 ==
In 1981 before Norström had started his profession as social anthropologist, he did a journey to the Malaysian part of Borneo with a friend and visited Sarawak and Sabah. There is a collection of photographs from this journey in the Museum of Ethnography in Stockholm. In an interview he says that the experience sparked a lasting interest in indigenous societies and cultural diversity and influenced his decision to pursue studies in social anthropology.

== Work among the Paliyan ==
Norström's doctoral dissertation,"They Call for Us": Strategies for Securing Autonomy among the Paliyans, Hunter-Gatherers of the Palni Hills, South India was based on fieldwork conducted among the Paliyan people during the 1990s. The first time he visited the Paliyan was in 1991 and after that he returned almost every year until 2003 when the dissertation was published.

The study explores how a traditionally hunter-gatherer society sought to maintain autonomy while becoming increasingly integrated into regional labour markets and state structures. According to Norström social organization is characterized by strong ideals of individual autonomy, flexibility, and egalitarianism. His dissertation examines how these values shape the group's relations with neighbouring communities, non-governmental organizations, and indigenous-rights movements.

There is a collection of photographs at the Museum of Ethnography, Stockholm Norström's 1991 fieldwork.

== Andaman Islands ==
Norström has also conducted fieldwork in the Andaman Islands. Following his university studies, he received a scholarship that enabled him to travel to the islands, where he began field-based research on indigenous communities. During this period, he established contacts with the Society for Society for Andaman and Nicobar Ecology (SANE), a collaboration that has continued since. In an interview with the Swedish daily Dagens Nyheter in 2018, he talks about visiting the islands repeatedly between 1988 and 2014. In the interview he discussed the history and policies surrounding the indigenous peoples of the archipelago, including the Sentinelese.

== Fiction writing ==
In addition to his academic publications, Norström has also written fiction. His crime novel Att dansa efter andras pipa was published in 2024. The novel is his first entry into crime fiction.
