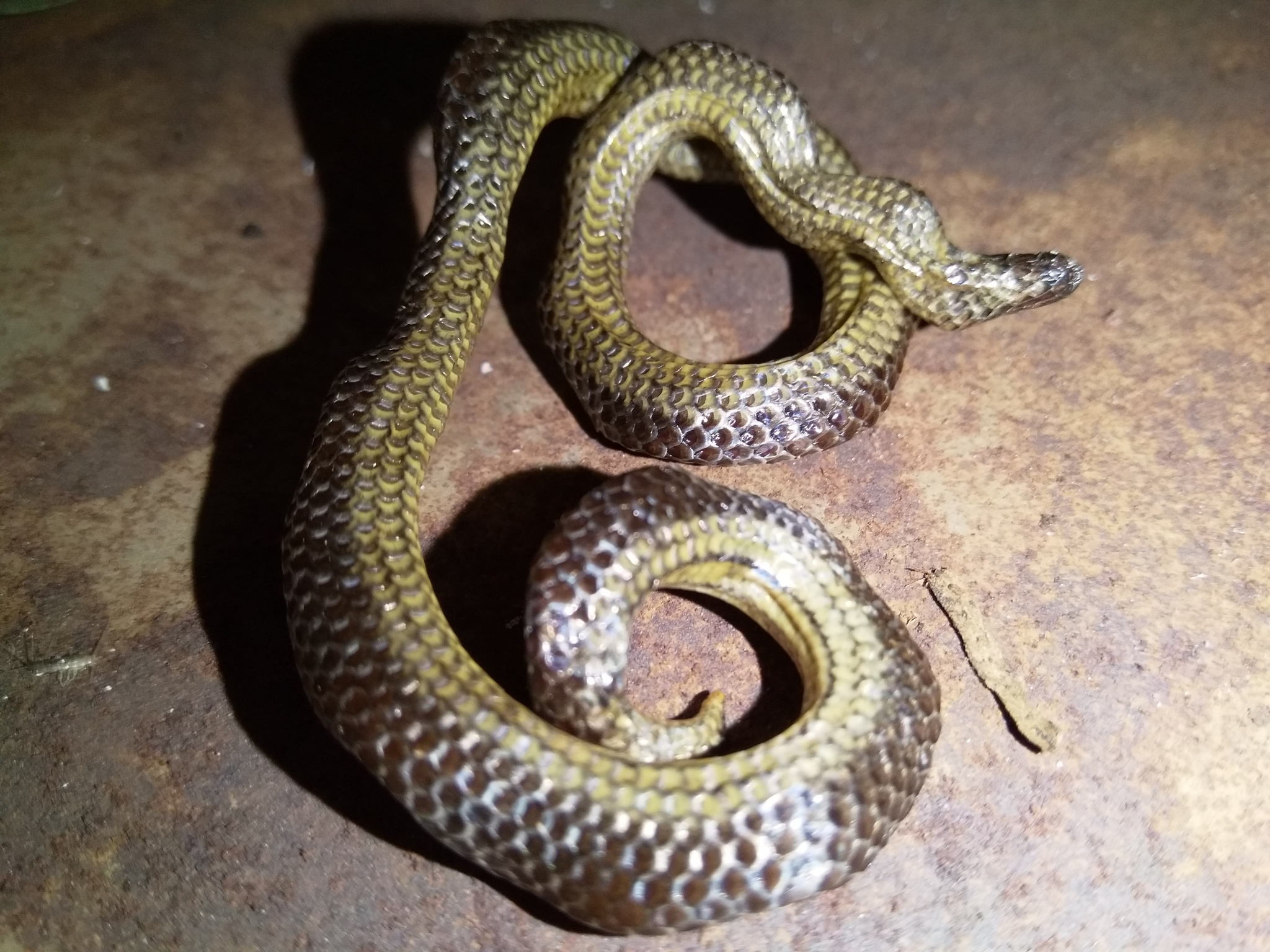

Conservation status
- Endangered (IUCN 3.1)

Scientific classification
- Kingdom: Animalia
- Phylum: Chordata
- Class: Reptilia
- Order: Squamata
- Suborder: Serpentes
- Family: Uropeltidae
- Genus: Platyplectrurus
- Species: P. madurensis

Binomial name
- Platyplectrurus madurensis Beddome, 1877

Synonyms
- Wallia inexpectata F. Werner, 1925; Platyplectrurus ruhanae Deraniyagala, 1954

= Platyplectrurus madurensis =

Species of snake

Platyplectrurus madurensis, commonly known as the Travancore Hills thorntail snake, Palni purple-brown worm thorntail snake, or Madurai shield-tail snake, is a species of uropeltid snake. It is found in southern India and, depending on the source, Sri Lanka.

== Geographic range ==
P. madurensis is found in the Western Ghats of India and in Sri Lanka.

Type locality of Platyplectrurus madurensis: "About Kodiukarnal on the Pulney Mountains (Madura district), 6000 feet elevation".

Type locality of Wallia inexpectata: "Südindien (Pulney Hills, Madura)".

Type locality of Platyplectrurus ruhanae: "Galle" district in the Southern Province, Sri Lanka.

== Description ==
The dorsum of P. madurensis is iridescent purplish brown. The ventrals and the scales in the two adjoining rows on both sides are white in the center, with purplish brown borders.

The longest of Beddome's type specimens measures 35 cm (13 3/4 in) in total length (including tail).

The dorsal scales are in 15 rows at midbody (in 17 rows behind the head). The ventrals number 158-175; and the subcaudals, 10–15.

P. madurensis is very similar to P. trilineatus, except the head shields are shorter, and the supraocular is not longer than the prefrontal. Diameter of body 38–42 times in total length.

== Subspecies ==
Two subspecies are recognized, including the nominate race.

- Platyplectrurus madurensis madurensis Beddome, 1877
- Platyplectrurus madurensis ruhanae Deraniyagala, 1954

The subspecific name, ruhanae, refers to the Ancient Sri Lankan Kingdom of Ruhuna (also spelled Ruhana). Some sources consider it to be a separate species.
