= Vilpatti =

வில் பதி என்ற சொல் நாள் அடைவில் வில்பட்டி எனா மாறியது
- town
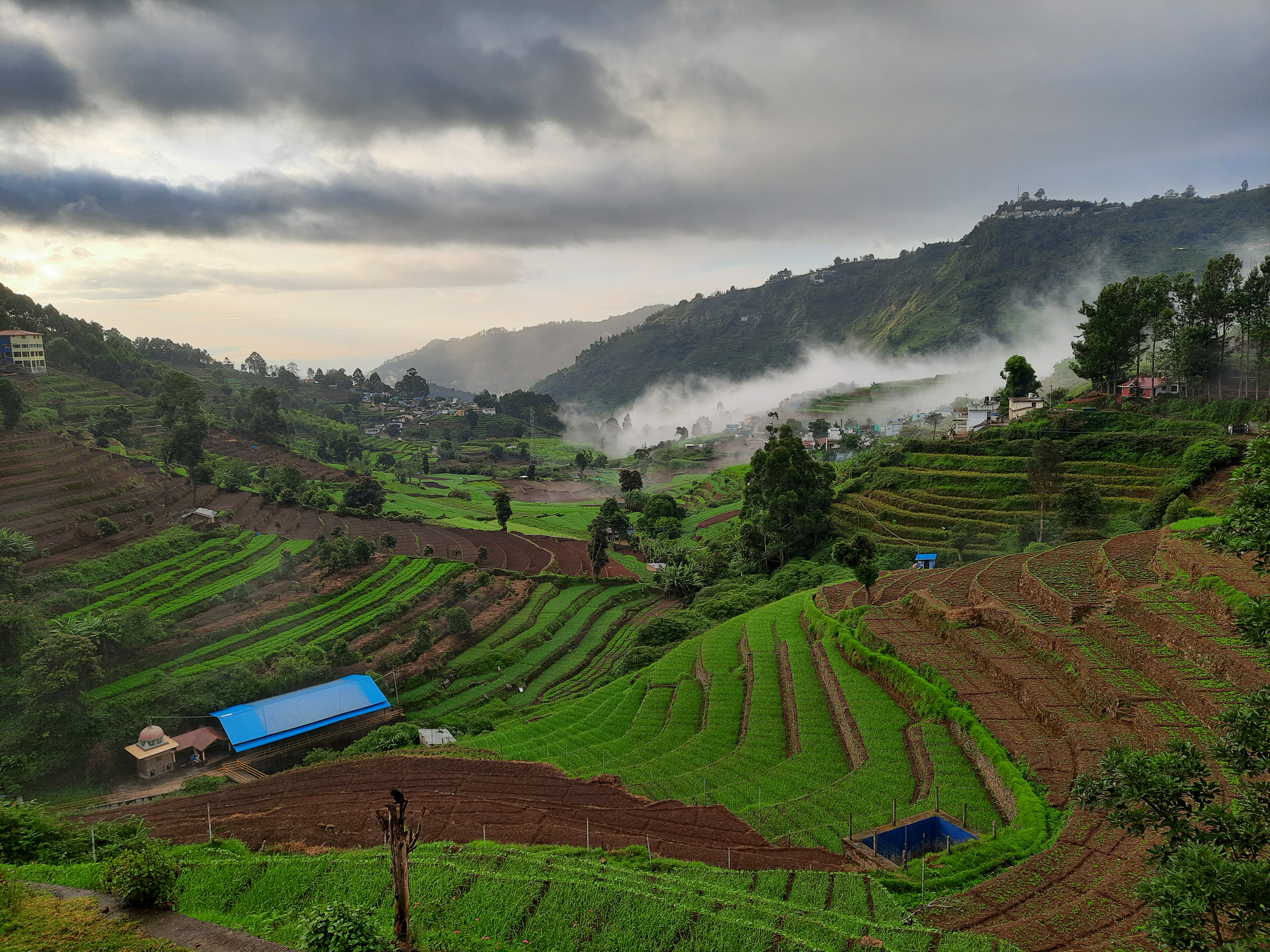
- Nickname: வில்பதி
- Location in Tamil Nadu, India வில் பதி என்ற சொல் நாள் அடைவில் வில்பட்டி எனா மாறியது (India)
- Coordinates: 10°16′2″N 77°30′5″E
- Country: India
- State: Tamil Nadu
- District: Dindigul
- Elevation: 1,770 m (5,810 ft)

Population (1991)
  - Total: 9,994

Languages
  - Official: Tamil
- Time zone: UTC+5:30 (IST)
- PIN: 624 101
- Telephone code: 04542
- Vehicle registration: TN-57
- Sex ratio: 52.4% / 48.6% ♂/♀

Vilpatti is a Panchayat in Kodaikanal Taluk of Dindigul district, Tamil Nadu state, South India. It is composed of the main village of Vilpatti and 11 hamlets. Main Vilpatti village is 9 km North of Kodaikanal town, but hamlets within its administration extend to the Palani ghat road. It is an agricultural area with the primary crops of potatoes, carrot, coffee and bananas.

The Ministry of Rural Development, rural roads connectivity project Pradhan Mantri Gram Sadak Yojana (PMGSY), has identified 12 habitations in Vilpatti: Vilpatty Gurusedimethu, Pethuparaipirivu, Attuvampatty, Periyaodai, Araikal, Uppuparaimethu, Bharathi annanagar, Kovilpatty, Pallangi, Perumpallam, Ganesapuram, Kurinji nagar.

== Demographics ==
Population in 1991 was 5,140 males; 4,854 females; 9,994 total The main Jāti communities are Reddiars, Pillais, Mannadiars, and Mudaliars. In 2001 the population of Dalit in 8 villages was:

Village	Scheduled caste	Scheduled tribe	Total
Vilpatti	750	370	1080
Attuvampatti	697	365	1062
Attuvampatty Colony	430	248	678
Melsurvey Number	415	225	640
Pethuparai	412	220	632
Kovilpatti	416	205	621
Perumpallam	363	205	568
Kurusedimethu	152	90	242
Total	3645	1828	5473

The Paliyan people are a major portion of the tribal community in Vilpatti.

== Schools ==
There are 10 primary schools in Vilpatti Panchayat including 6 Panchayat Union Schools, Gandhiji Aided Primary School, St Marys Aided Primary School, Un Aid Primary School and Un Aid Nursery Primary School. There is a Government High School at Vilpatti and many children from Vilpatti area go to St. Xavier's High School in Kodaikanal.

The Vilpatti Village Project (VVP) started on 15 February 1989, via a strong connection between local women and Christine King, (née Cox) who raised funds and was financially supported by the International Childcare Trust UK. The project initially ran medical, educational, vocational and childcare programmes to meet the practical needs of poor women and children.

The Satya Surabhi School in Attuvampatti valley provides value-based education and nutritious noon meals to children of the farm labourers and petty vendors of Attuvampatti.

The Mother Teresa Women's University expanded their facilities to an additional 55 ha (22 acre) campus at Attuvampatti valley in 2004. MTWU is distinctive as India's only university exclusively devoted to women's issues. The Kodaikanal Institute of Technology at Machur Village is a 180-seat self-financed engineering college at Vilpatti granting B.E. degrees in Computer Science & Engineering, Electronics and Communication Engineering, Information Technology.

== Tourism ==
Elephant Valley Estate at Ganesh Puram 10°18.602′N 77°31.218′E near Vilpatti, is a 100-acre (0.40 km^{2}) private nature reserve and organic farm welcoming eco-tourists. They offer private cottages, tent houses, an Indo-continental fusion organic foods restaurant, trekking, nature walks and horse riding. They promote the conservation of traditional varieties of fruits, vegetables and cereals. They have orchards of lime, orange, avocados, guavas and amla inter-cropped with coffee, pepper, vanilla, cinnamon, nutmeg, mangoes, jack fruit, pomegranate, guavas and bananas. The estate provides local jobs and makes a contribution to sustainable development of the area.

A popular 16 km hiking route between Kodaikanal and Palni passes through Vilpatti.

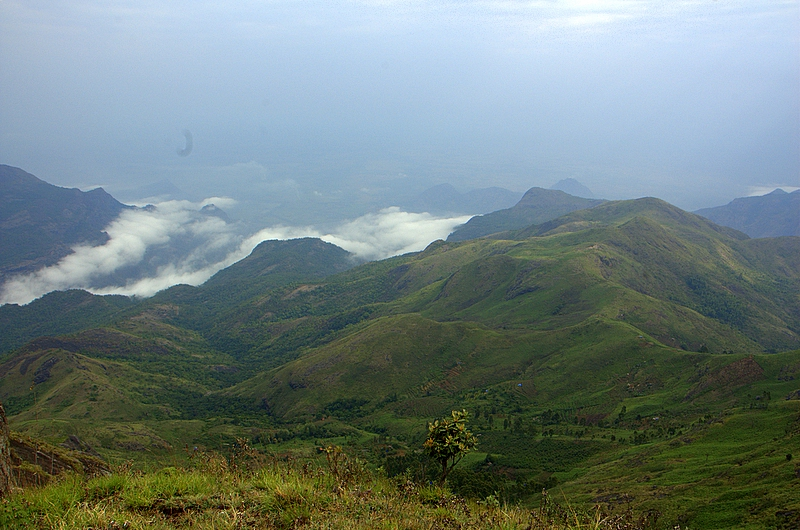
Due north view from Vilpatti.

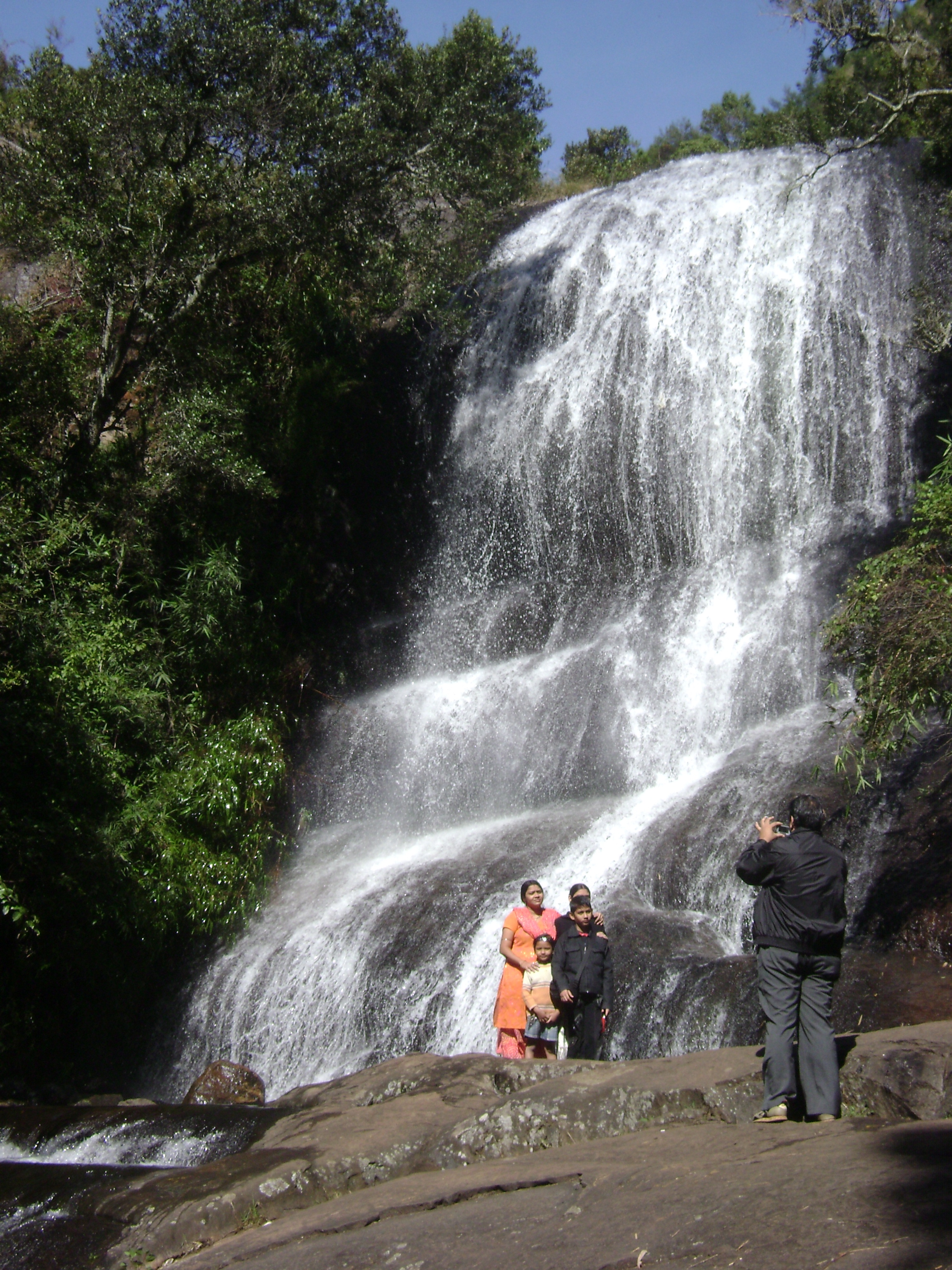
The Bear Shola Falls are located at the southern end of Vilpatti.
