= Paliyan =

Group of Dravidian tribals living in South India

The Paliyan, or Pulliyar, Palaiyar or Pazhaiyarare, are a group of around 9,500 formerly nomadic Dravidian tribals living in the South Western Ghats montane rain forests in South India, especially in Tamil Nadu and Kerala. They are traditional nomadic hunter-gatherers, honey hunters and foragers. Yams are their major food source. In the early part of the 20th century the Paliyans dressed scantily and lived in rock crevices and caves. Most have now transformed into traders of forest products, food cultivators and beekeepers. Some work intermittently as wage laborers, mostly on plantations. They are a Scheduled Tribe. They speak a Dravidian language, Paliyan, closely related to Tamil. Subgroups include Magam, Malaiarasan, and Patian.

== Past studies ==
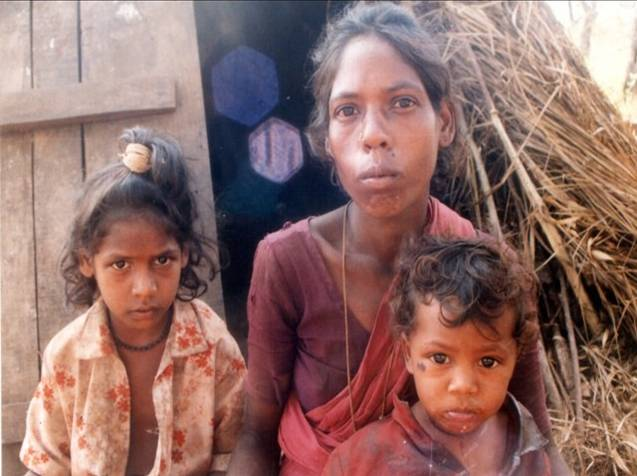
Paliyan woman & children

"Thurston,(1909) quoting from the writing of Rev. F. Dahman.(1908) describes Palians as nomadic tribe, who for the most part rove in small parties through the jungle clad gorges (Sholas) that fringe the upper Palnis plateau. Pate (1916) describes Paliyans as a "Very backward caste who live-in small scattered parties amid the jungles of the upper Palnis and the Varrushanadu valley". Gardner describes Paliyans as moderately dark in complexion, short in stature, and their physical characteristics fall within the range of South and South East Asian.

- Peter M. Gardner, the foremost English Paliyan Author, states that Paliyans have distinctive ways:

- To learn subsistence skills with minimal formal verbal instruction.
- To ascertain themselves what others denote by terms – in the face of substantial interpersonal knowledge variation.
- To "know" by testing empirically the validity of theories (e.g., on the condition of a hunted animal) .
He summarizes: "The Paliyan prescription for a good life - residing in a natural setting, cultivating a mature and independent self, respecting all others and fostering a peaceful society".

- An important Interdisciplinary Conference on the Livelihood strategies among forest-related tribal groups of South India: Contextual analysis of local livelihood strategies, was held at the Centre for Indian Studies, Mysore, India, 17–19 October 2003. 21 papers were presented by 32 participants from several of the major universities of South India, the Anthropological Survey of Calcutta and Mysore, and other institutions. The academic disciplines represented were mainly Social Anthropology, Sociology, Linguistics and Botany. The abstracts of 12 papers are available online.
- Christer Norström provides detailed ethnographic notes on the Paliyan, hunter-gatherers of South India, and the possibility of keeping a hunter-gatherer ethos in spite of long-time involvement in a market economy. Christer's fieldwork during 1991-2001 reveals where the Paliyan for decades have combined hunting and gathering with work within a plantation economy, it seems that the economic relations between them and their landholding Tamil neighbors is based on negotiation rather than subordination. These findings challenge earlier views, grounded on an ecological framework, which states the incompatibility between contemporary hunting and gathering societies and an expanding modern market economy.
- V.Dakshinamurthy initiated his work on the Paliyan at Sirumalai hills, Dindigul District, Tamil Nadu, India followed by extensive studies about the traditional knowledge of the Paliyan at the lower Palni hills, Dindigul District, Tamil Nadu. Paliyan are also living in Varushanad, Sathuragiri.
- About 500 families live in Idikki Didtrict, Kerala. About 400 Paliyar Live in Manjampatti Valley, Coimbature District, Tamil Nadu.

== Displacement ==
- Selvakumar (1999) explains about forced migration through history with specific note on how the Paliyan of Madurai were banished to the hills. The Paliyans, displaced and dispossessed by various groups and by the nation state throughout their history, are in a pathetic state now. Though the Tamil Nadu government has built houses for a few Paliyan families at Kurinji Nagar (8 km west of Usilampatti), several of the Paliyan are without proper houses. The future of the Paliyan is very tenuous now that the forests, which are denuded due to illegal poaching and timber-cutting by the people from the plains, have much less area and biodiversity.
- Atrocities against Paliyar tribal families, living in remote villages of lower Kodaikanal Hills, have come to light. The families, living for a long time at Vellakavai, Chinnur and Periyur villages, had been engaged in cultivating common millet, ragi, coffee and oranges. Owing to persistent threat from encroachers, many of them would not like to go back to their villages. There was also constant threat to a few tribals who challenged the encroachers. Fifty-eight tribal families, belonging to Paliyar community, who had been living for generations on the Sathuragiri hills in Madurai district allege that they are being driven out of their 'motherland' by Forest department officials. Having learnt to live with nature's fury, these families lived on the hilltop but came down lured by the 'promises' of Government officials of getting group houses two decades ago. They now feel that they are losing their rights over the forest and its produce.

== Diet ==
- Gardner has described traditional hunting and gathering techniques in detail: foraging for yams and sago, hunting of small game, fishing, and honey collecting. He has shown that Paliyan data refute the century-old theory (revived by Bose in 1956 and by Fox in 1969) that Indian foragers are "professional primitives," unable to subsist on hunting and gathering alone.
- Tamilarasi, Murugesan and Ananthalakshmi (1991) have studied the dietary practices of the Paliyar tribal group and the nutrient content of unconventional foods consumed. The dietary pattern of the Paliyar tribal people was peculiar by the inclusion of local, natural resources, or unconventional foods. The studies were carried out at Vadakaraparai, Moolayar, Valaigiri, Velankulam and Boy's town area of Dindigul District.

== Social controls ==
Peter M. Gardner (2000) studied the conflict resolution and nonviolence among recently sedentary Paliyan foragers. According to his research, Paliyan foragers in south India remain relatively nonviolent when becoming sedentary. Successful Paliyan peacekeeping may be due in part to both the multiplicity of their safeguards, the prevention of positive feedback and retreat from conflict. In the long run, however, altered treatment of children foreshadows change.

== Environmental issues ==
The Paliyan are not very willing agents of all this destruction; but with their traditional hunting - gathering economy no longer a practical proposition, they are dependent on forest produce collection for a living. As such, they have been directly responsible for the destruction of many species, including the cinnamon through bark collection. But now with only a small population of cinnamon trees surviving deep in the core of the forest, the Paliyan have informed the contractor that 'the cinnamon has been exhausted, and leave these trees alone'

== Ethnomedicine ==
- Traditional botanical preparations represent the primary resource for health care in Paliyan society. Tribal herbal practitioners play an important role in helping keep the Paliyans healthy. The most common ailments treated are skin problems, burns, wounds, cuts, and diseases of the skin. Other illnesses alleviated by herbal medicines include respiratory infections, coughs, fevers, and colds, and gastrointestinal problems, abdominal pains, stomach aches, throat infections, snake bites, nervous disorders and more.
- Ganesan, Suresh and Kesaven (2004), have surveyed the Ethnomedicine of lower Palni Hills. In the attempt, the ethno medicinal aspects of 45 species of plants used by the Paliyan and Paliyan tribes of lower Palni Hills (both northern and southern slopes), Tamil Nadu have been enumerated.
- Dakshinamurthy from Gandhigram Rural University conducted micro studies of the Paliyan at Sirumalai Hills and major work In the Palni Hills documenting the ethno botanical knowledge of the Paliyan.
- "Ethnobotanical investigations among the Sathuragiri Paliyans resulted in the identification of 134 medicinal plants that are used by them to treat common ailments such as cold, cough, head ache, snake bites, poisonous insect bites and digestive disorders. Many of these diseases can be traced back to their environmental and occupational hazards. The Paliyans of Sathuragiri are prone to skin diseases. A few members in the community are recognized as Vaidyars or medicine man to whom the majority turns up when sick"
- Paliyan theories of illness, shamanistic diagnosis, and 75 measures for treatment of illness and injury have been described.
- According to Palani Hills Adivasis Liberation Movement general secretary Leelawathi, the Central and State governments allocate crores of rupees every year for the welfare and upliftment of the tribals. But whether even a minor percentage of this amount is really spent on the welfare of the tribals was doubtful, taking into consideration, the appalling conditions under which they live, alienated from their traditional lands.
