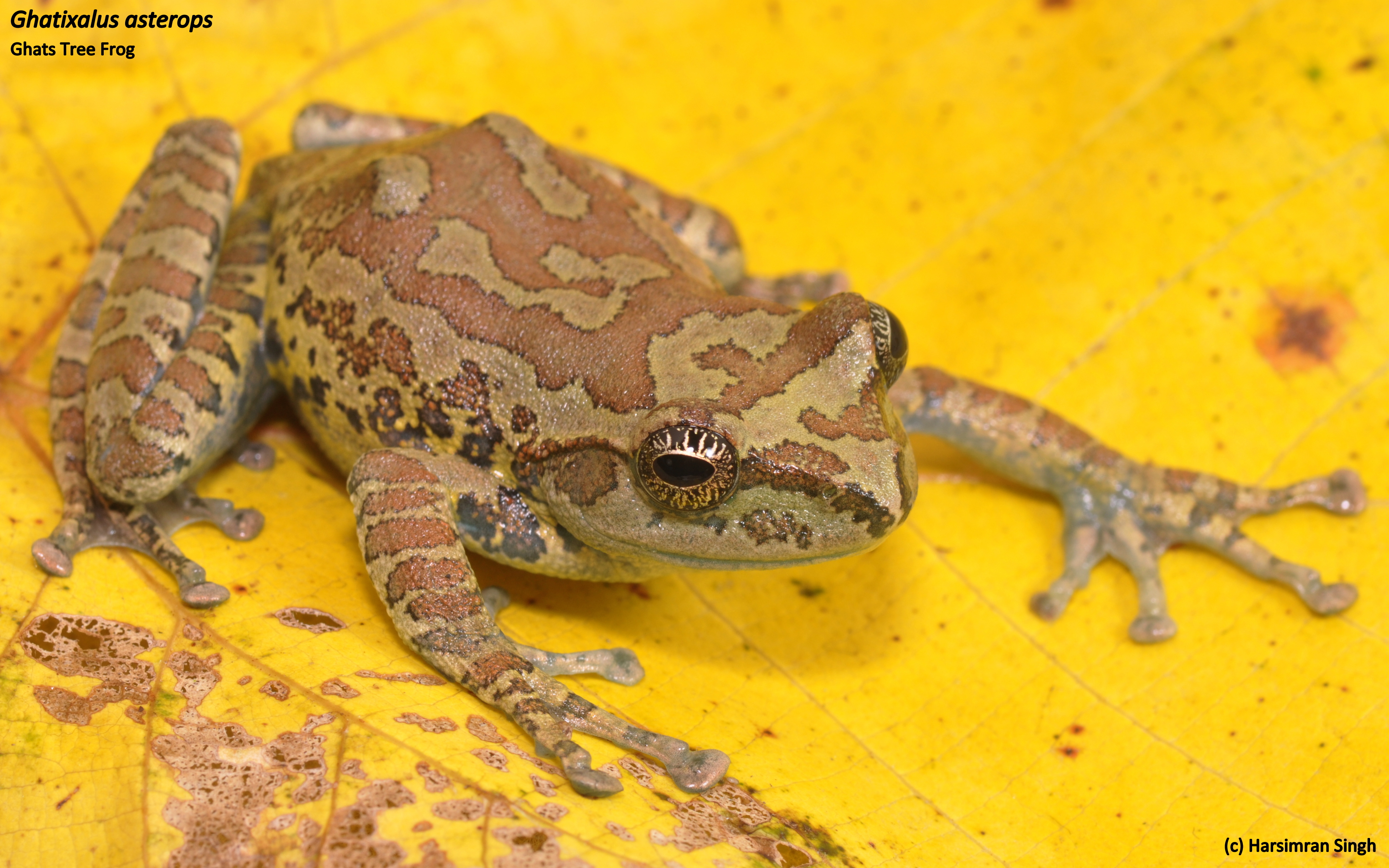

Conservation status
- Near Threatened (IUCN 3.1)

Scientific classification
- Kingdom: Animalia
- Phylum: Chordata
- Class: Amphibia
- Order: Anura
- Family: Rhacophoridae
- Genus: Ghatixalus
- Species: G. asterops

Binomial name
- Ghatixalus asterops Biju, Roelants, and Bossuyt, 2008

= Ghatixalus asterops =

Species of amphibian

Ghatixalus asterops, the Ghat tree frog or starry-eyed Ghat tree frog, is a species of frog in the subfamily Rhacophorinae. It is endemic to India's Western Ghat mountains, specifically the Palani Hills and south of the Palghat Gaps.

== Appearance ==
The adult male frog measures about 38.8 mm – 44.8 mm in snout-vent length and a single adult female specimen 58.1 mm. Adult frogs can vary in color between individuals. The skin of the dorsum can be dark gray or light gray in color with brown marks or it can be yellow-brown in color with red marks. The skin near the tympanum, which is readily visible, is light gray with brown spots. The sides of the body are yellow with some brown color. The four feet are light blue-white with blue-brown marks on the webbed skin. The upper hind legs are blue-brown in color. The iris of the eye is brown in color with thick gold lines in a shape resembling a star. There is also a gold circle around the outside of the iris. Juvenile frogs can be light green or light brown in color. Adults are never green in color.

== Habitat ==
People have observed this frog in disturbed shola forest habitats high in the hills. People have seen it in the dead leaves on the ground. These frogs spend more time near ephemeral streams than near permanent streams. People have also observed it on tea farms. This frog stays between 1300 and 2000 meters above sea level. This frog is terrestrial, not arboreal like other Rhacophoridae. When disturbed, this frog will hide in the water for several minutes.

== Life cycle ==
The female frog makes a nest out of foam on rocks in the stream, on the sides of the stream, or sometimes on tree trunks near the stream. The eggs hatch into tadpoles that live in rocky streams with briskly flowing water. The tadpoles have substantial oral suckers that they use to anchor themselves in the current.

== Threats ==
Scientists believe this frog is in limited danger of dying out because it lives in such a small place. Scientists cite climate change and habitat fragmentation as threats to this frog.

== Taxonomy ==
Scientists classify this frog is sister species to Ghatixalus variabilis.
