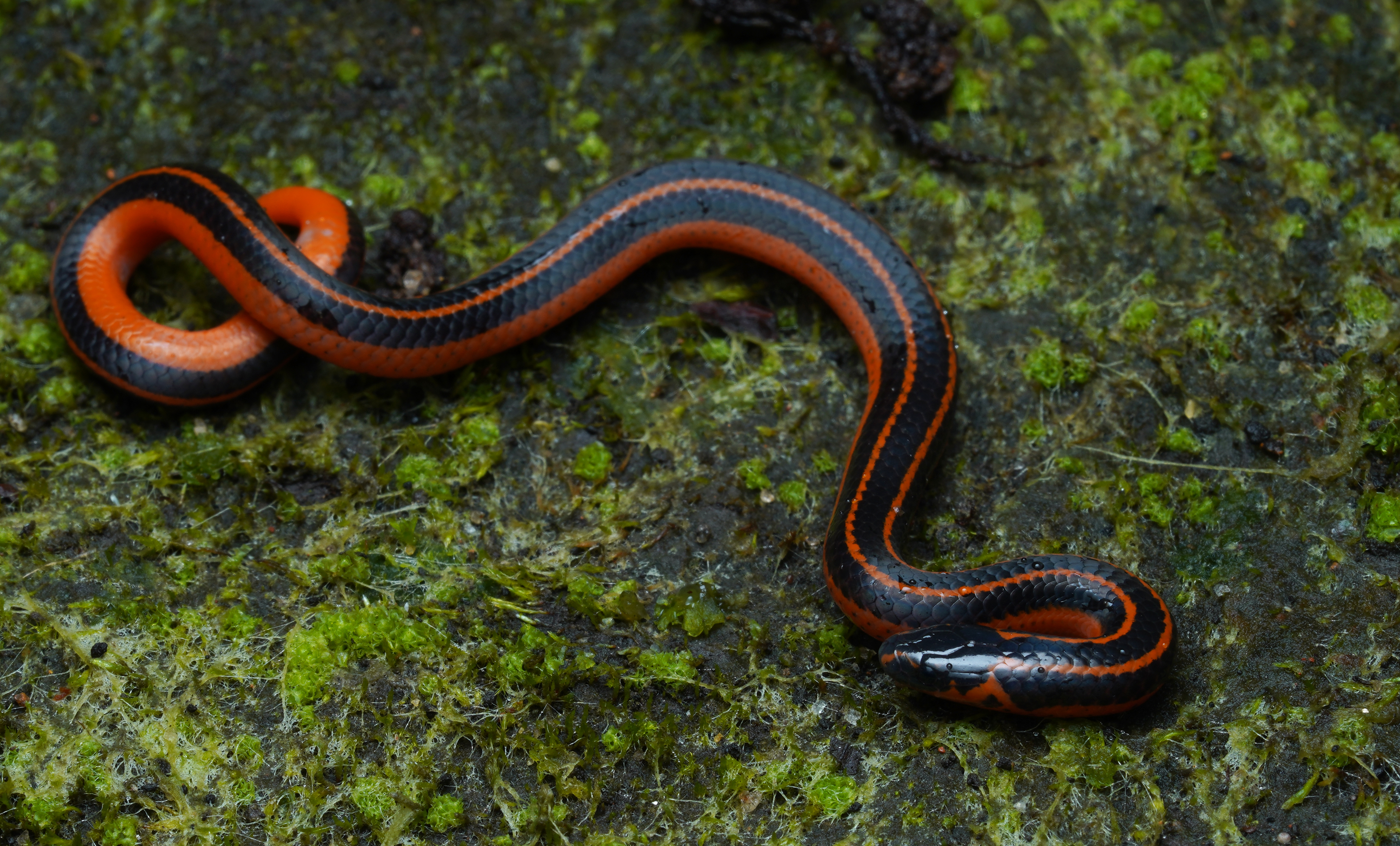

Conservation status
- Data Deficient (IUCN 3.1)

Scientific classification
- Kingdom: Animalia
- Phylum: Chordata
- Class: Reptilia
- Order: Squamata
- Suborder: Serpentes
- Family: Uropeltidae
- Genus: Platyplectrurus
- Species: P. trilineatus

Binomial name
- Platyplectrurus trilineatus (Beddome, 1867)

Synonyms
- Plectrurus? [sic] trilineatus Beddome, 1867; Platyplectrurus trilineatus; Günther, 1868; Platyplectrurus bilineatus Beddome, 1886; Platyplectrurus trilineatus; Boulenger, 1893

= Platyplectrurus trilineatus =

Species of snake

Platyplectrurus trilineatus, commonly known as the tri-striped shield-tail snake or the lined thorntail snake, is a species of uropeltid snake endemic to the Western Ghats of Southern India. Like most other shieldtail snakes, it is presumed to be a nocturnal, fossorial snake inhabiting evergreen forests. A very rare snake, about which nothing is known in terms of live colouration and natural history.

== Geographic range ==
It is found in southern India in the southern Western Ghats in the Anamalai Hills of Kerala and Tamil Nadu states.

Type locality of Plectrurus trilineatus: "Anamally forests; elevation 4,000 feet".

Type locality of Platyplectrurus bilineatus: "Madura Hills".

== Description ==
Adults are reddish brown or brick-red dorsally, with three black stripes, which may be either continuous or interrupted.

The young are dark brown or black dorsally, with two or more narrow yellowish stripes, yellowish ventrally, with a brown dot on each ventral scale. Juveniles also have yellowish transverse markings behind the shielded part of the head, which may resemble an incomplete collar.

Adults may attain a total length of 40 cm (15 3/4 in).

Dorsal scales arranged in 15 rows at midbody (in 17 rows behind the head). Ventrals 163-175; subcaudals 8-16.

Snout broadly rounded. Rostral small, but visible from above. Frontal longer than broad. Supraocular much larger than the eye, longer than the prefrontal. One elongated temporal, which is 2/3 or 3/5 the length of the parietal. Ventrals nearly two times as broad as the contiguous scales. Dorsal scales of the tail smooth or a few of the terminal ones weakly bicarinate or tricarinate. Terminal scute with a transverse ridge which is less distinct in females.
