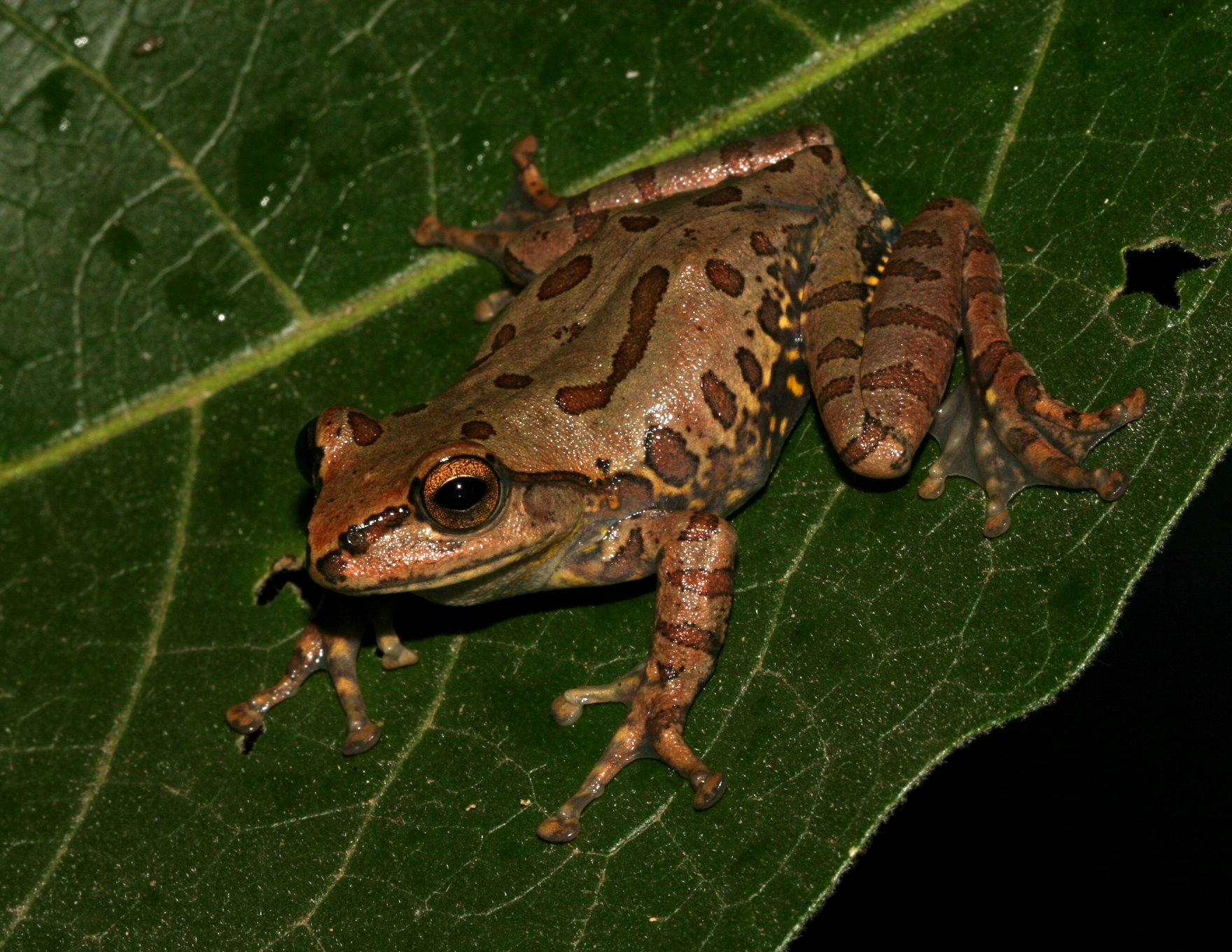

Conservation status
- Endangered (IUCN 3.1)

Scientific classification
- Kingdom: Animalia
- Phylum: Chordata
- Class: Amphibia
- Order: Anura
- Family: Rhacophoridae
- Genus: Ghatixalus
- Species: G. variabilis

Binomial name
- Ghatixalus variabilis (Jerdon, 1854)

Synonyms
- Polypedates variabilis Jerdon, 1854; Rhacophorus variabilis (Jerdon, 1854); Polypedates pleurostictus Günther, 1864; Rhacophorus parkeri Ahl, 1927

= Ghatixalus variabilis =

Species of frog

Ghatixalus variabilis is a species of frog in the family Rhacophoridae. It is endemic to the Western Ghats of southern India. It has a number of common names, including green tree frog, though it is terrestrial rather than arboreal in its life style.

== Description ==
Male Ghatixalus variabilis grow to a snout-vent length of 41–51 mm (1.6–2.0 in) and females to about 67 mm (2.6 in). Males have nuptial spines. The colour is variable, even within a single location. The dorsum has a colour pattern characterized by prominent dark brown blotches.

Ghatixalus variabilis build spherical foams nests that are suspended up to 3 m (9.8 ft) above the water. Tadpoles hatch within the foam and drop to the water after a few days. The tadpoles live in rocky streams and have large oral suckers that they use for anchorage.

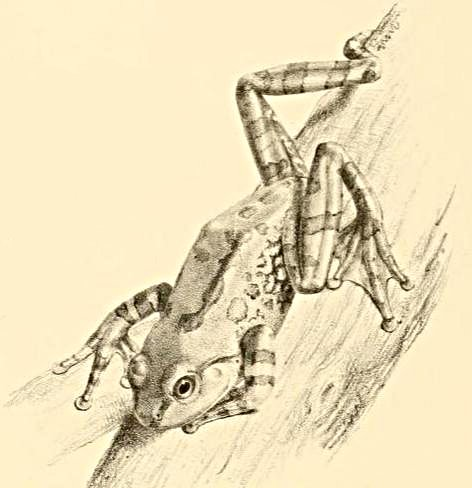
Illustration of Polypedates pleurostictus from Albert Günther's The Reptiles of British India where it was described as a new species in 1864. A study published in 2001 considered it to be synonym of Ghatixalus variabilis, although another study published the same year doubted this. At present, it is treated as a synonym of G. variabilis.

== Habitat and distribution ==
Ghatixalus variabilis is found in the Nilgiri hills (a part of the Western Ghats), Tamil Nadu, India. They are found in evergreen montane forest patches at high altitudes, between 925 and 2630 meters above sea level. They are only found very near mountain streams, either on ground or low in the vegetation. When disturbed they escape to the water.

This frog is threatened by deforestation and habitat fragmentation. The patches of remaining forest are separated by farmland, which prevents frogs from moving between enclaves. Changes to average temperatures in the Nilgiri Hills have changed the water table, which has facilitated the growth of invasive tree species, including eucalyptus, lantana, acacia, wattle, and pinewoods, which are outcompeting shola forests. Scientists also cite climate change as a threat to this frog.
