= Palani Hills =

Mountain range in India

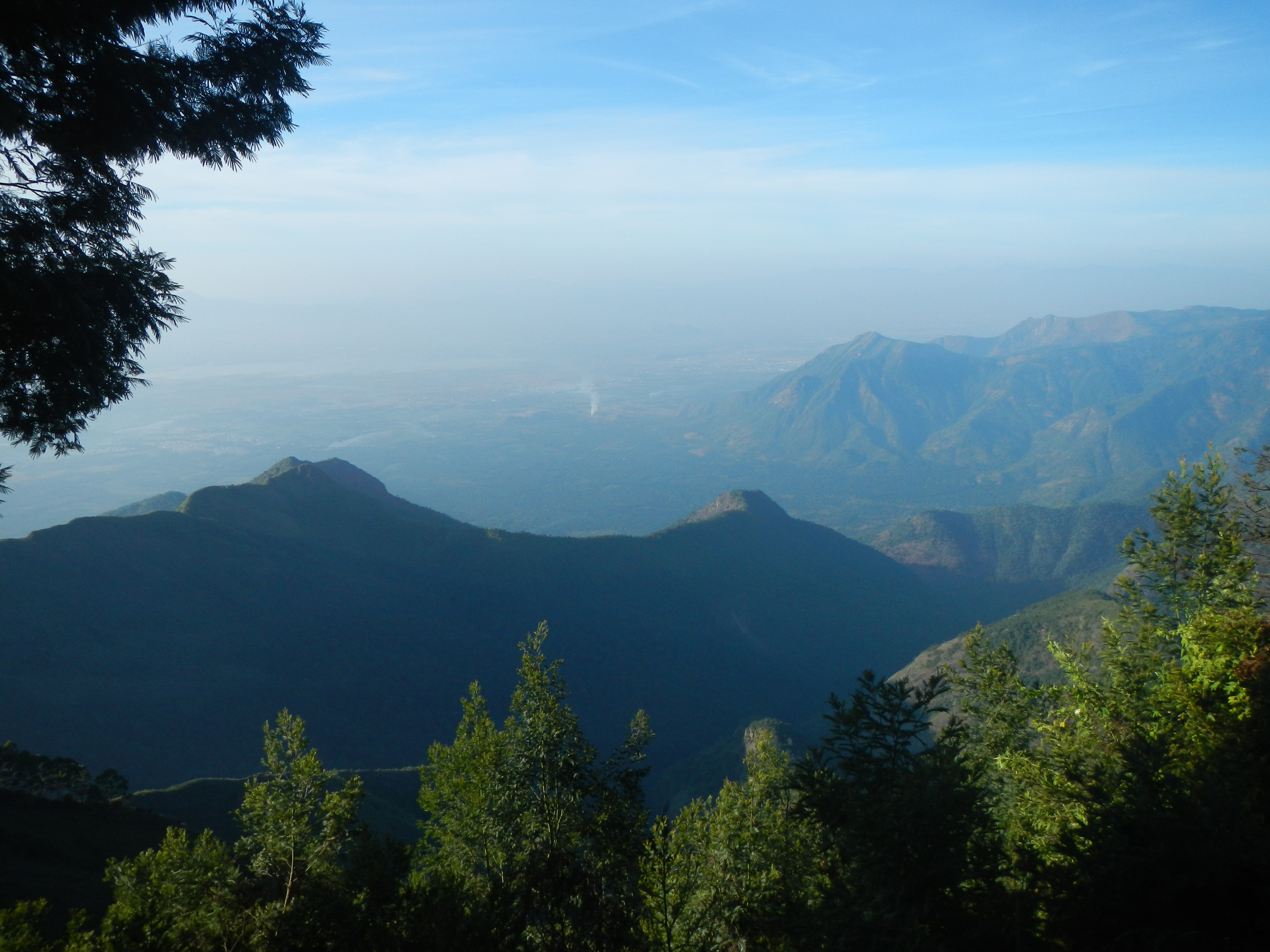
- The southern slope of the Palani Hills, near Kodaikanal

Highest point
- Elevation: 2,533 m (8,310 ft)
- Coordinates: 10°12′N 77°28′E

Geography
- Location: Tamil Nadu, India
- Parent range: Western Ghats

Climbing
- Easiest route: Laws Ghat Road

Palani Hills Wildlife Sanctuary and National Park (proposed)
- Kodaikanal Wildlife Sanctuary
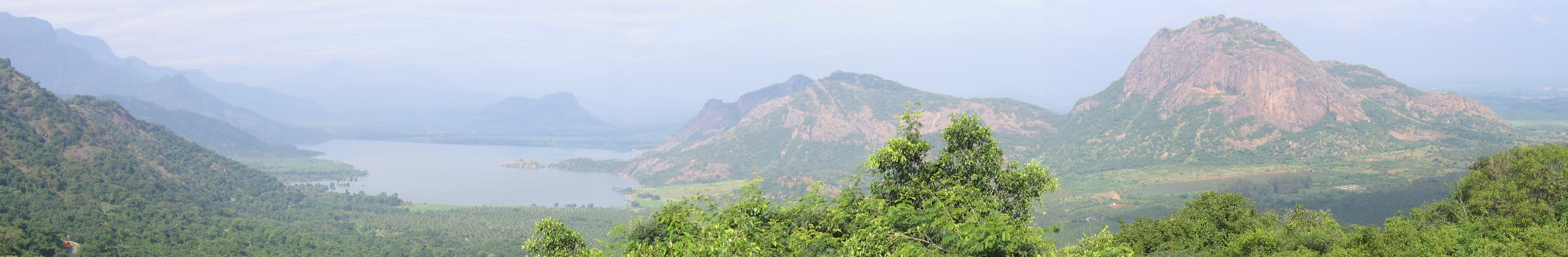
- The Palani Hills

- Location within India
- Location: Dindigul District, Tamil Nadu; Idukki District, Kerala, India
- Nearest city: Kodaikanal
- Coordinates: 10°14′43″N 77°31′26″E
- Area: 736.87 square kilometres (284.51 sq mi)
- Governing body: Tamil Nadu Forest Department

The Palani Hills are a mountain range in the southern Indian states of Tamil Nadu and Kerala. The Palani Hills are an eastward extension of the Western Ghats ranges, which run parallel to the west coast of India. The Palani Hills adjoin with the high Anamalai range on the west and extend east into the plains of Tamil Nadu, covering an area of 2,068 square kilometres (798 sq mi). The highest part of the range is in the southwest, and reaches 1,800-2,500 metres (5,906-8,202 feet) elevation; the eastern extension of the range is made up of hills 1,000-1,500 m (3,281-4,921 ft) high.

It is also home to the main temple of Murugan, who is worshipped as a major deity in Tamil Nadu.

The Palani Hills Wildlife Sanctuary and National Park is a proposed protected area in Dindigul District, Tamil Nadu. The park will be an upgrade and expansion of the 736.87 km^{2} (284.51 sq mi) Palani Kodaikanal Wildlife Sanctuary which was to be established in 2008. The park includes about 36% of the 2,068 km^{2} (798 sq mi) in the Palani Hills. The park is located between latitude 10°7'–10°28' N and longitude 77°16'–77°46' E. Central location is 1.5 kilometres (0.93 mi) east northeast of Silver Cascade Waterfall and 4 km (2.5 mi) E X NE of Kodaikanal Lake.

== History ==
Boundary of the Wildlife Sanctuary

The Palani Hills derive their name from the ancient temple town of Palani (பழநி in Tamil) located at the northern base of the hills.

In 1906, the great undulating plateau on top of the Palanis comprising four forest ranges were consolidated under the Indian Forest Act of 1878 and designated by the British Government as a single reserve forest, from Kodaikanal town to the Kerala state border in the west and the Bodinayakkanur town limits to the south, and given the name of the Ampthill Downs. It was over 140 square kilometres (53 sq mi) in extent and about one quarter of it then consisted of sholas and three quarters was open, rolling, grassy downs.

The Ampthill Downs area is now named Upper Palani Shola Reserved Forest and totals 145.7 square kilometres (56.3 sq mi) (36,000 acres) of forest land. It is the largest reserve forest division in the Palani Hills. The core of the proposed Kodaikanal Wildlife Sanctuary awaiting government notification is located in this division.

In 1988, the new 50 square kilometres (19 sq mi) Kodaikanal-Berijam Wildlife Sanctuary was included in the protected area proposals considered to be of national priority status by the Wildlife Institute of India. In the early 1990s, the Tamil Nadu Forest Department submitted a proposal to the State government to protect much of the Palani Hills by declaring the area a wildlife sanctuary or a national park.

The proposed park area includes only reserve forest land. These forests are already among the protected areas of Tamil Nadu. Their upgrade to Wildlife Sanctuary and National Park will increase their IUCN status from level VI - Protected Area with Sustainable Use of Natural Resources to IV - Habitat/Species Management Area or II - National Park and improve the habitat and wildlife conservation of the area.

The sanctuary has been under consideration of the Government of India in consultation with the Government of Tamil Nadu since 1999. The actual park boundaries have not been finalized. In 2007, proposals for declaration of Kodaikanal Wildlife Sanctuary were under consideration of the Government.

On 13 August 2012, in an apparent change away from plans for notification of parts of the Palani Hills as a separate wildlife sanctuary, the Tamil Nadu Gazette notification attached parts of Kodaikanal and Dindigul divisions of reserve forests to the buffer zone of Annamalai Tiger Reserve. About 5155.42 hectares of forest land belonging to Palani Hills Northern Slope, Andipatty reserve forest, 4,344.53 acres in Kudraiyar block forest and 5,548.49 hectares in Mannavanur Range in Kodaikanal will be included in the buffer zone. The villages and hamlets that now form part of the Palani Hills buffer zone are Poondi, Mannavanur, Kilavarai, Polur, Kavunchi, Kumbur, Kilanavayal, Kukkal, Pazhamputhur and Puthurpuram.

The increasingly important economic role of Eco-tourism, including trekking, hiking, camping, mountaineering, rock climbing and bird watching may help the local populace to welcome this new Protected area. It remains to be seen whether the Wildlife Sanctuary and National Park will stimulate or stifle commercial development and tourism. The decision to finally establish the park must balance short term financial benefits of the status quo versus long term stability of the natural and human community.

== Geography ==
Vandaravu peak is the highest peak in the Palani hills. The range lies between the Cumbum Valley on the south, which is drained by the Vaigai River and its upper tributaries, and the Kongunadu region to the north. The northern slopes are drained by the Shanmukha River, Nanganji River, and Kodavanar River, which are tributaries of the Kaveri River. The range lies mostly within Dindigul district, except in the western portion, where it forms the boundary between Dindigul district and Theni district to the south and Idukki District to the south west. The hill station of Kodaikanal lies in the southern central portion of the range. Palani Hills joined with Anamalai Hills and Cardamom Hills at Anamudi peak in Kerala state. Vattavada in Kerala is a part of Palani hills.

The Palni Hills are an eastward spur of the Western Ghats with a maximum east–west length of 65 kilometres (40 mi), and a north–south width of 40 kilometres (25 mi). Area is 2,064 square kilometres (797 sq mi). These hills rise in steep escarpments to a high undulating plateau ranging from 1,600 metres (5,200 ft) to over 2,000 metres (6,600 ft) elevation.

The western extremity of the park is contiguous with the Manjampatti Valley core area of the Indira Gandhi Wildlife Sanctuary and National Park and with The Chinnar Wildlife Sanctuary in Kerala. The Kurinjimala Sanctuary in Kerala borders the southwestern corner of the park. These Wildlife Sanctuaries are adjacent to the recently established Eravikulam National Park.

The park area includes only reserve forest land, including Palni Hills Northern Slope East, Kallar, Palni Hills Southern Slope East, Upper Palni Shola, Allinagaram, and Palni Hills Northern Slope West Reserve Forests in the Dindigul and Kodaikanal Forest Divisions.

== Ecoregions ==
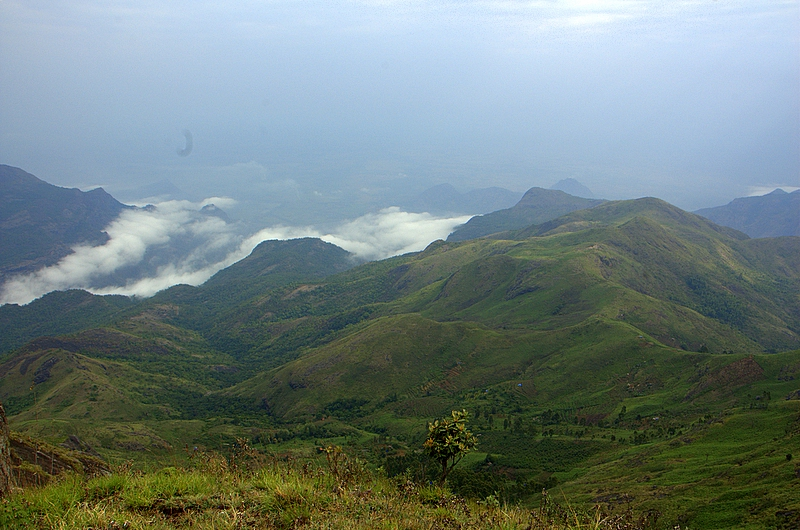
View of the Palani Hills from Vilpatti

The lower elevations of the Palani Hills, between 250 and 1,000 m (820–3,281 ft), are part of the South Western Ghats moist deciduous forests ecoregion. Above 1,000 m (3,281 ft), the deciduous forests transition to the evergreen South Western Ghats montane rain forests. In the highest portions of the range, above 2,000 m (6,562 ft), the montane rainforests give way to shola-grassland mosaic, made up of frost-tolerant montane grasslands interspersed with pockets of stunted shola forests. The hills extend into Kerala as Pampadum Shola National Park.

== Conservation ==
The Palani Hills are currently subject to increasing development pressure as it is under developed for a long time. The Palani Hills Conservation Council, a non-governmental organization headquartered in Kodaikanal, was founded in 1985. In the early 1990s the Tamil Nadu Forest Department proposed to the Tamil Nadu state government that much of the range be granted protected status as a wildlife sanctuary or Palani Hills Wildlife Sanctuary and National Park.

== Geology ==
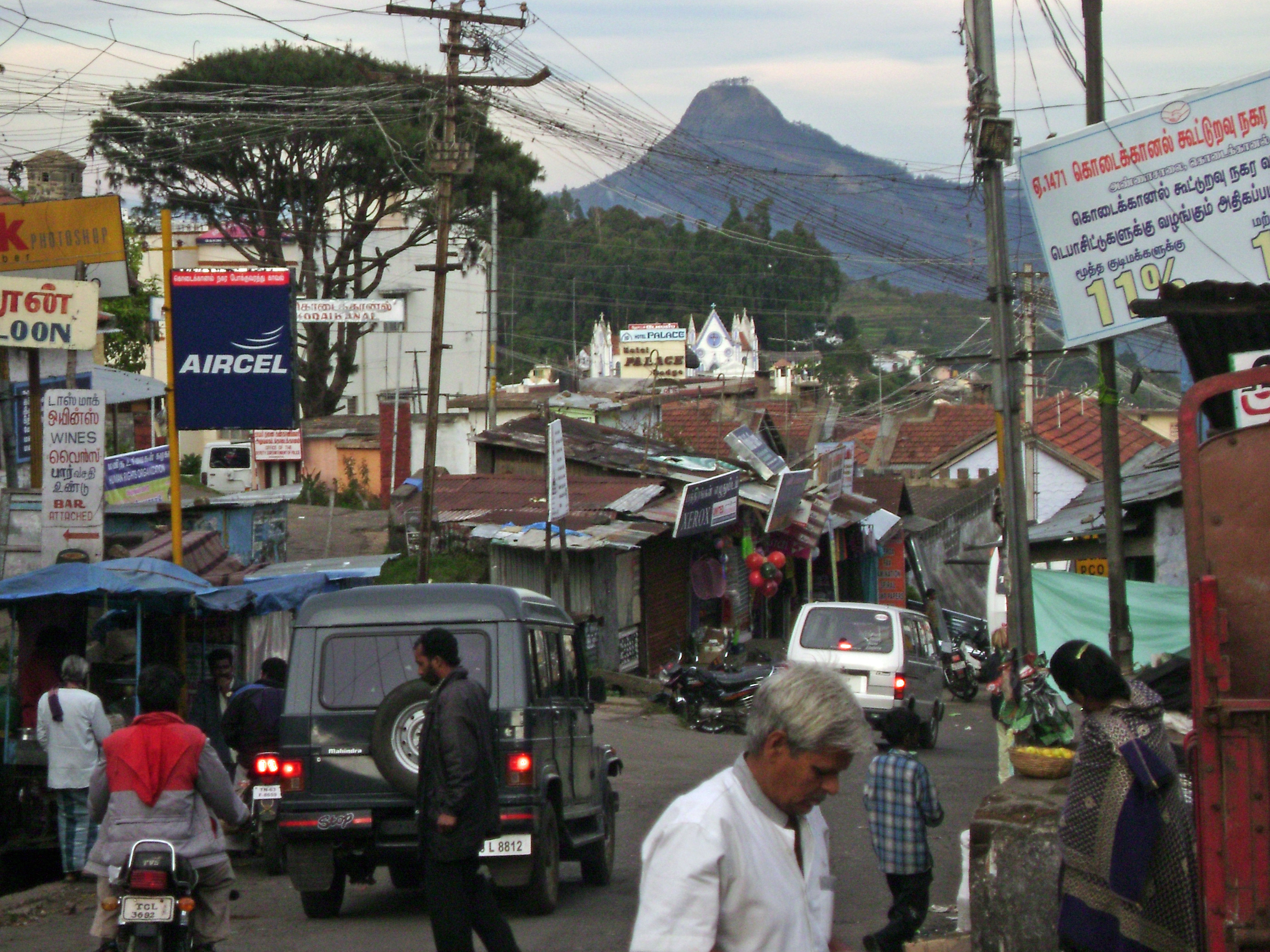
Perumal Malai in distance seen from Anna Salai, Street bazaar, Kodaikanal, 12.5 kilometres (7.8 mi) away

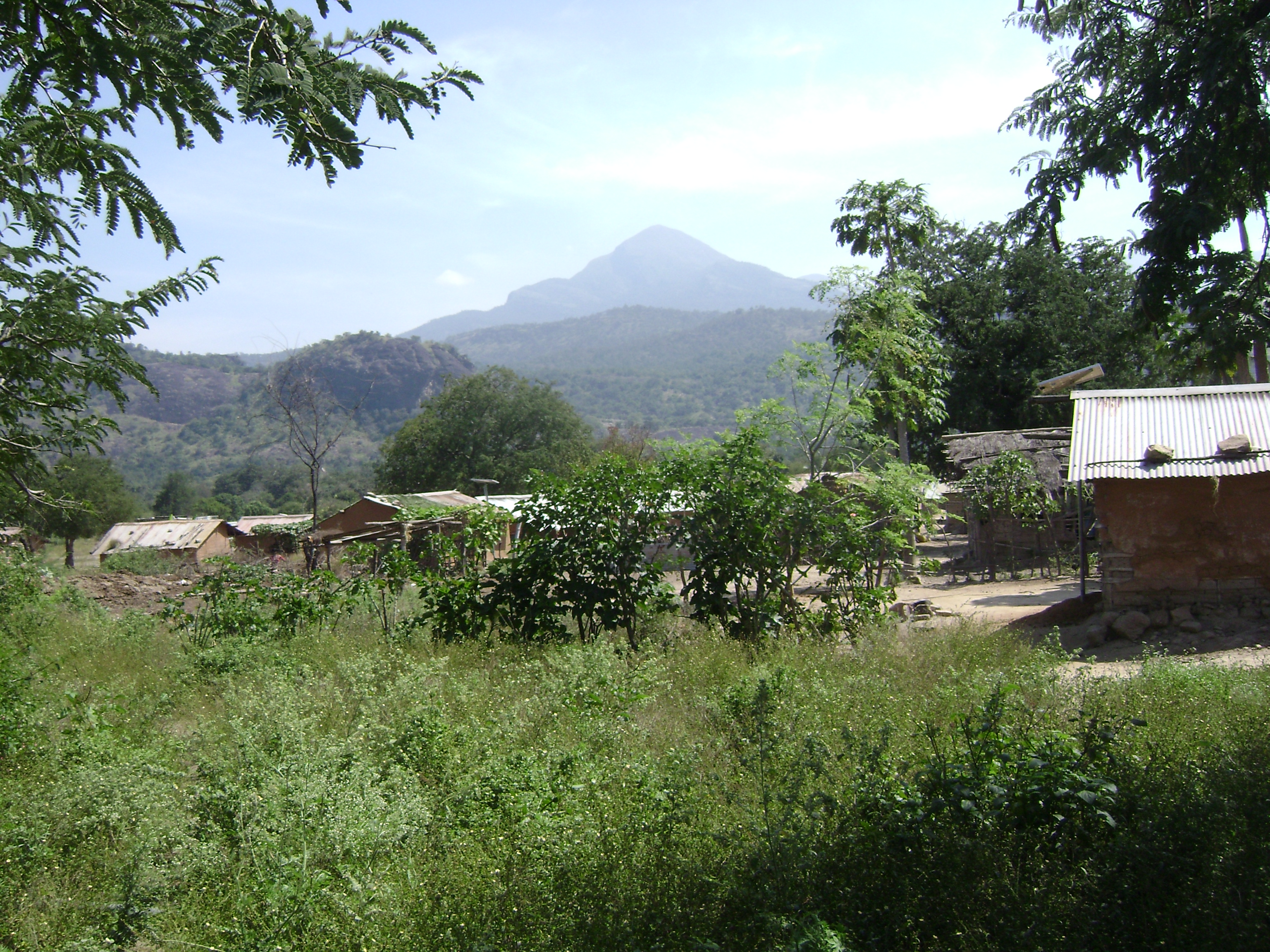
Vellari Malai Peak, seen from Talinji Village, 12.5 kilometres (7.8 mi) away

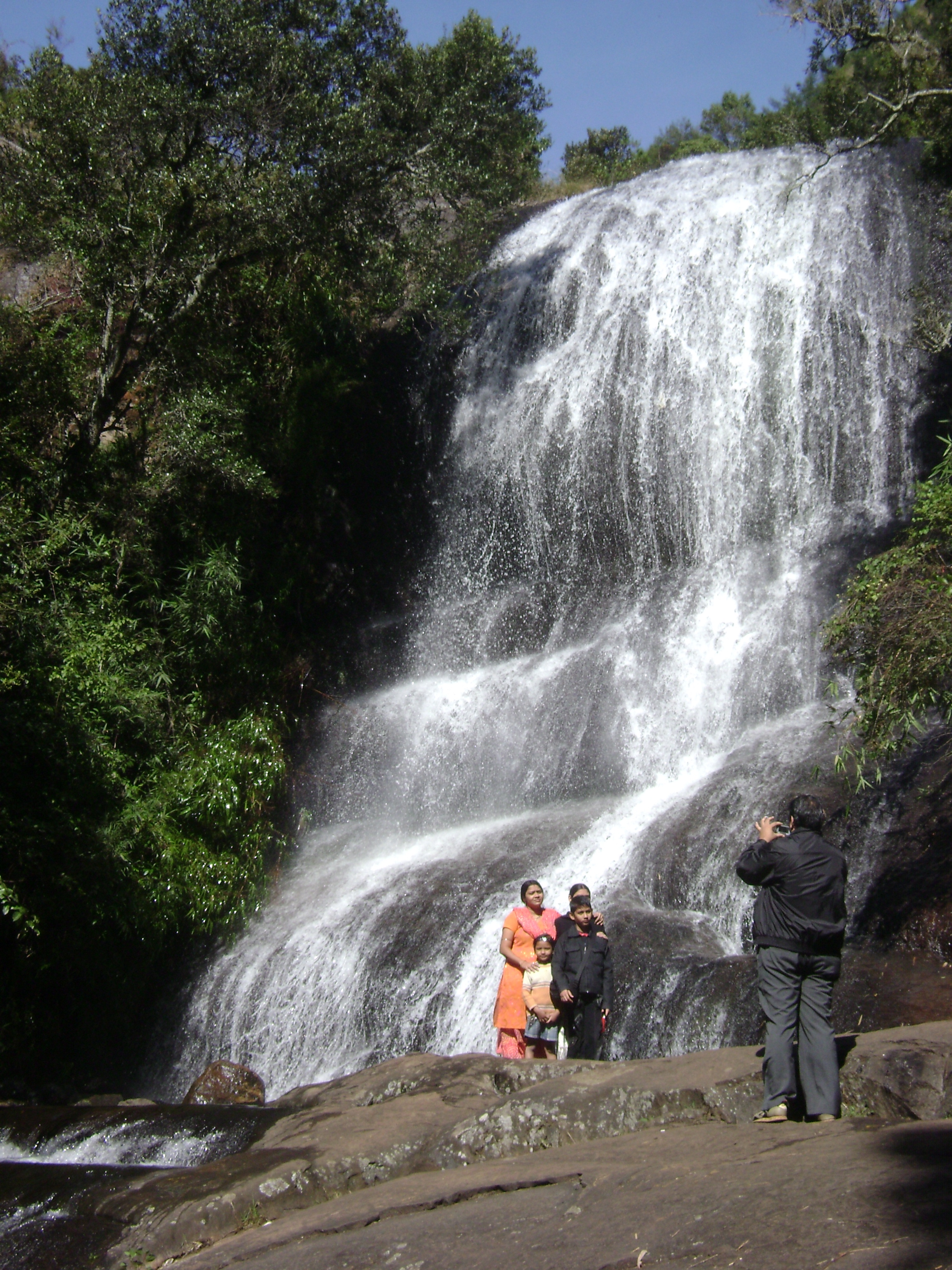
3. Bear Shola Falls

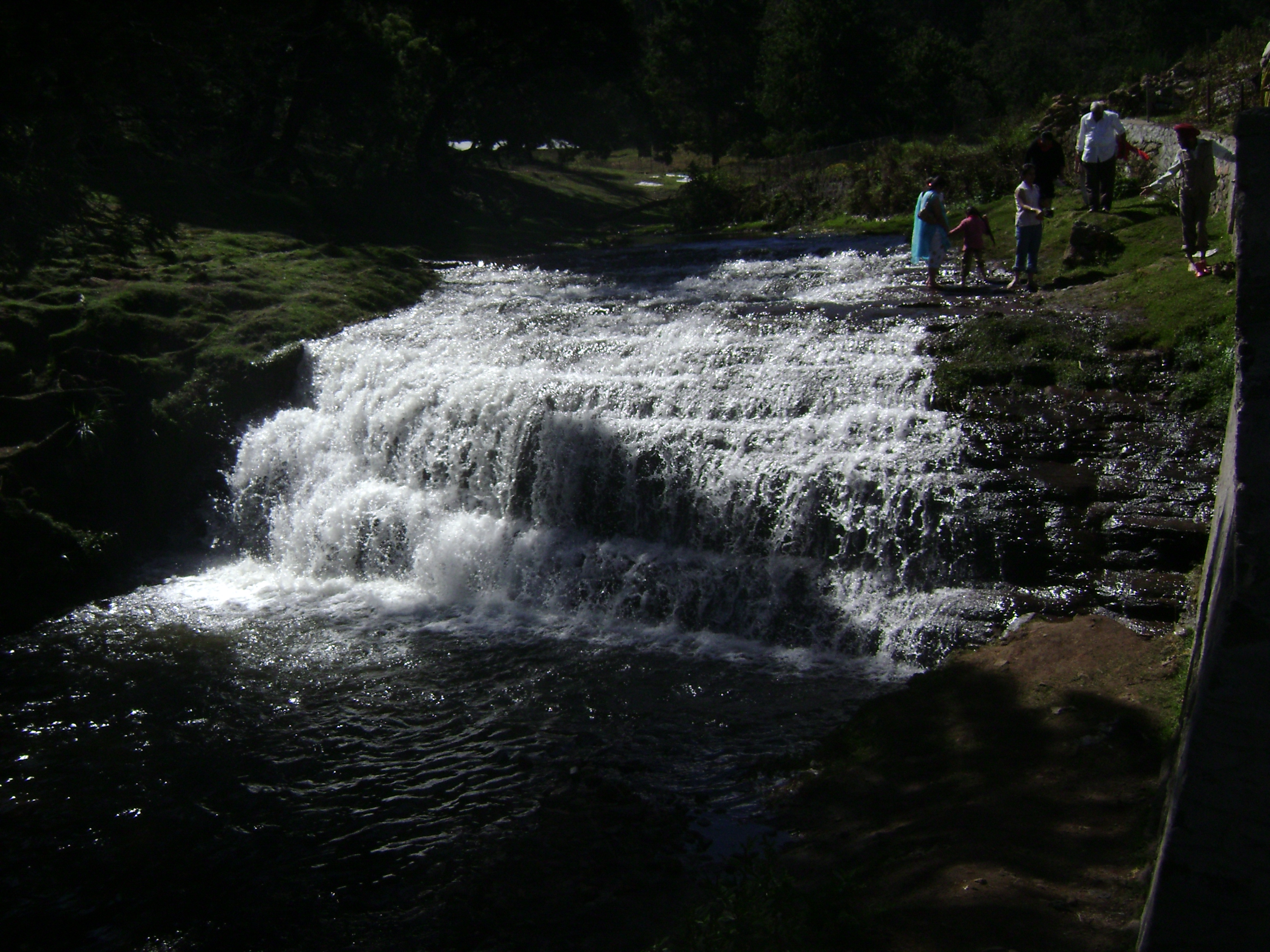
5. Fairy Falls

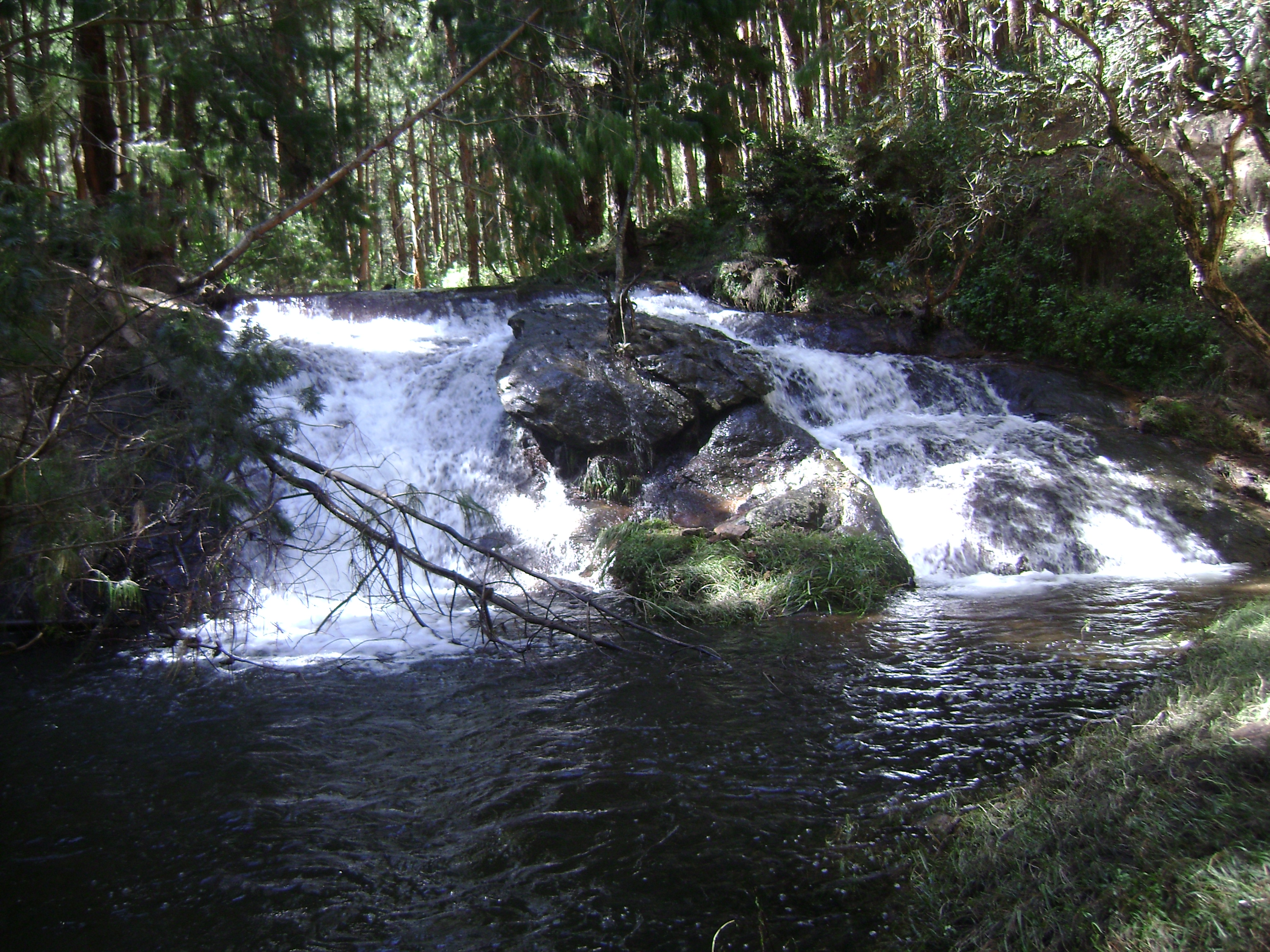
8. Neptune Falls and Pool

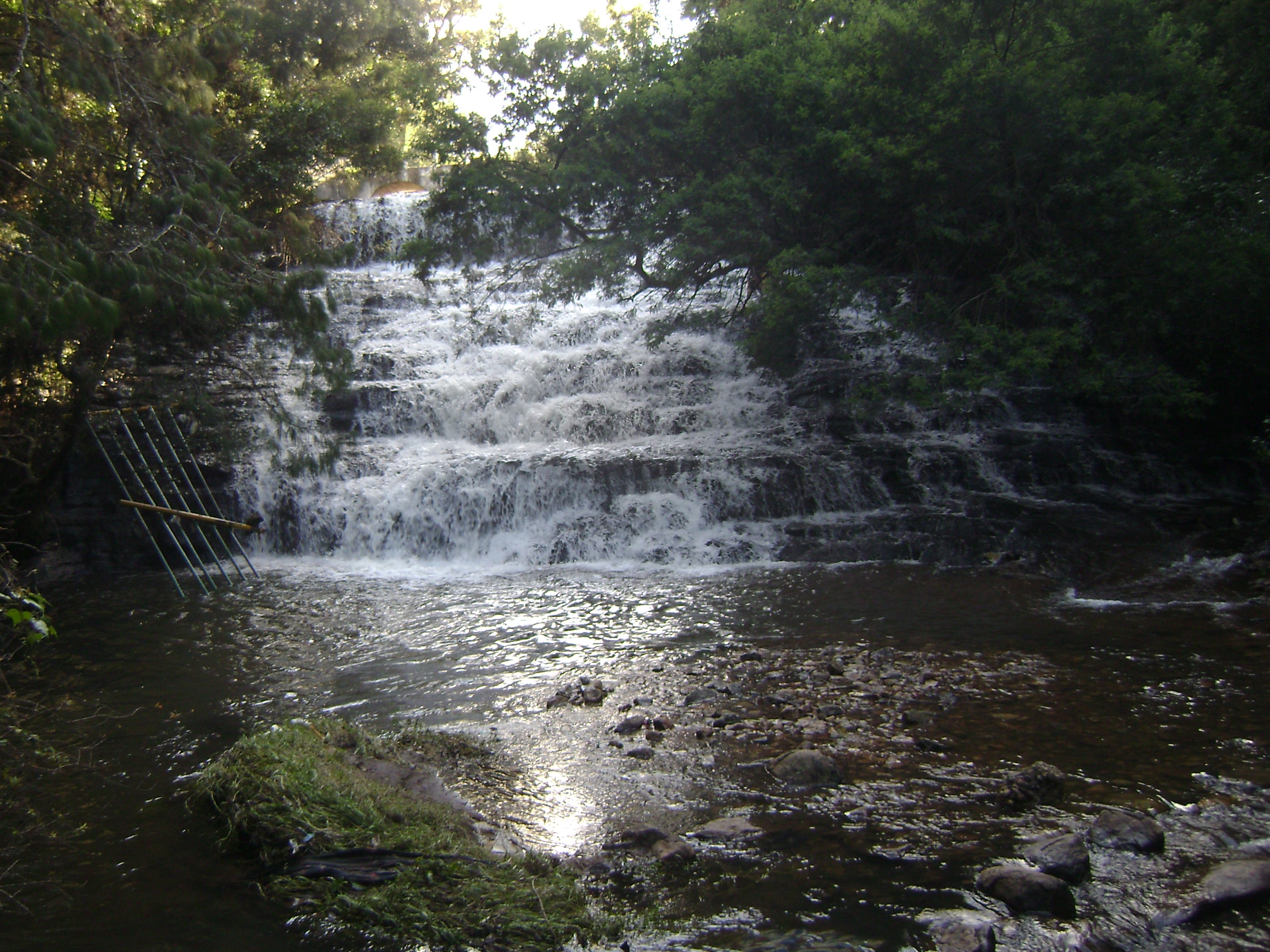
10. Pambar Falls

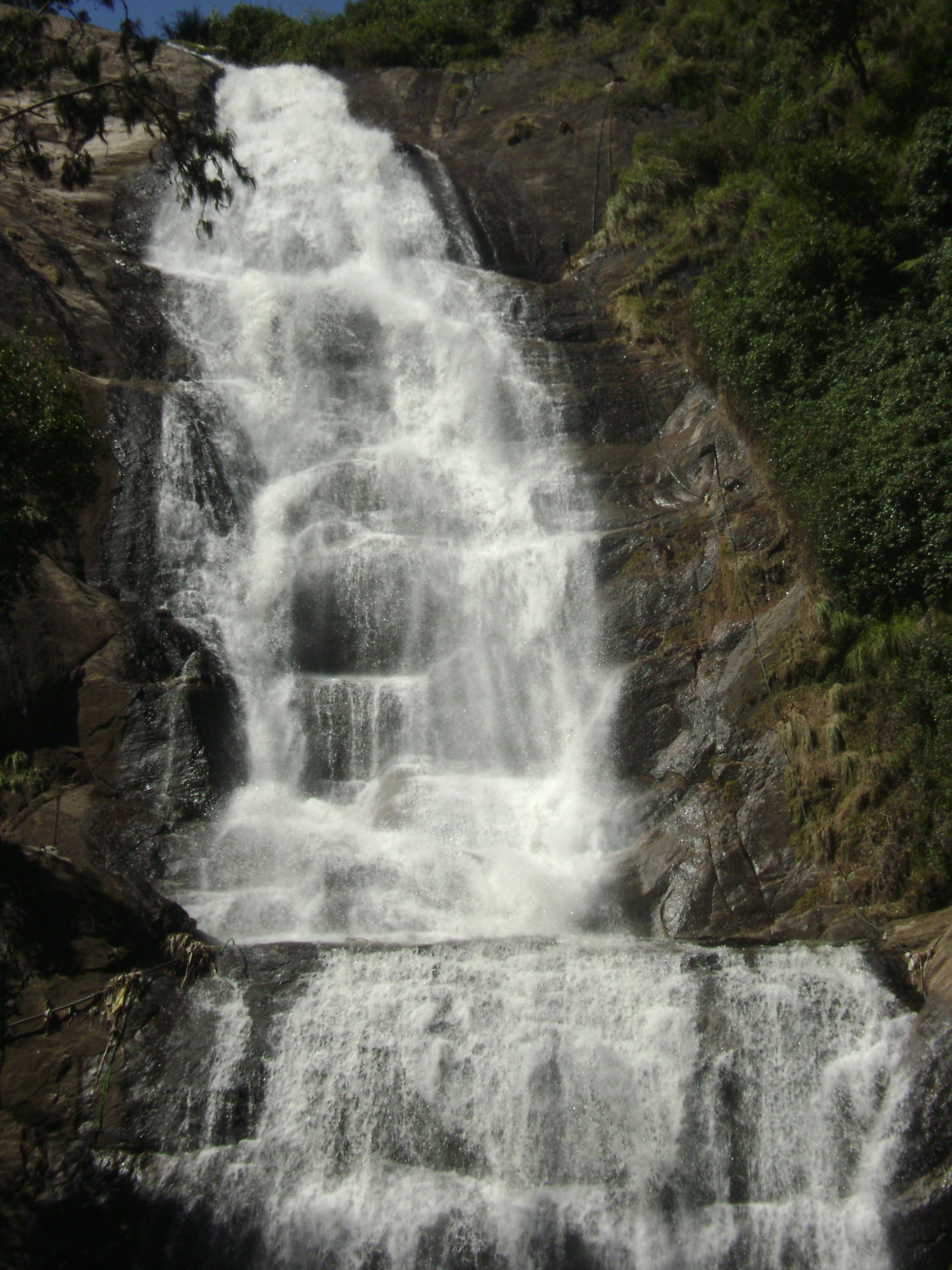
11. Silver Cascade, 55 m high, < 1/4 flow

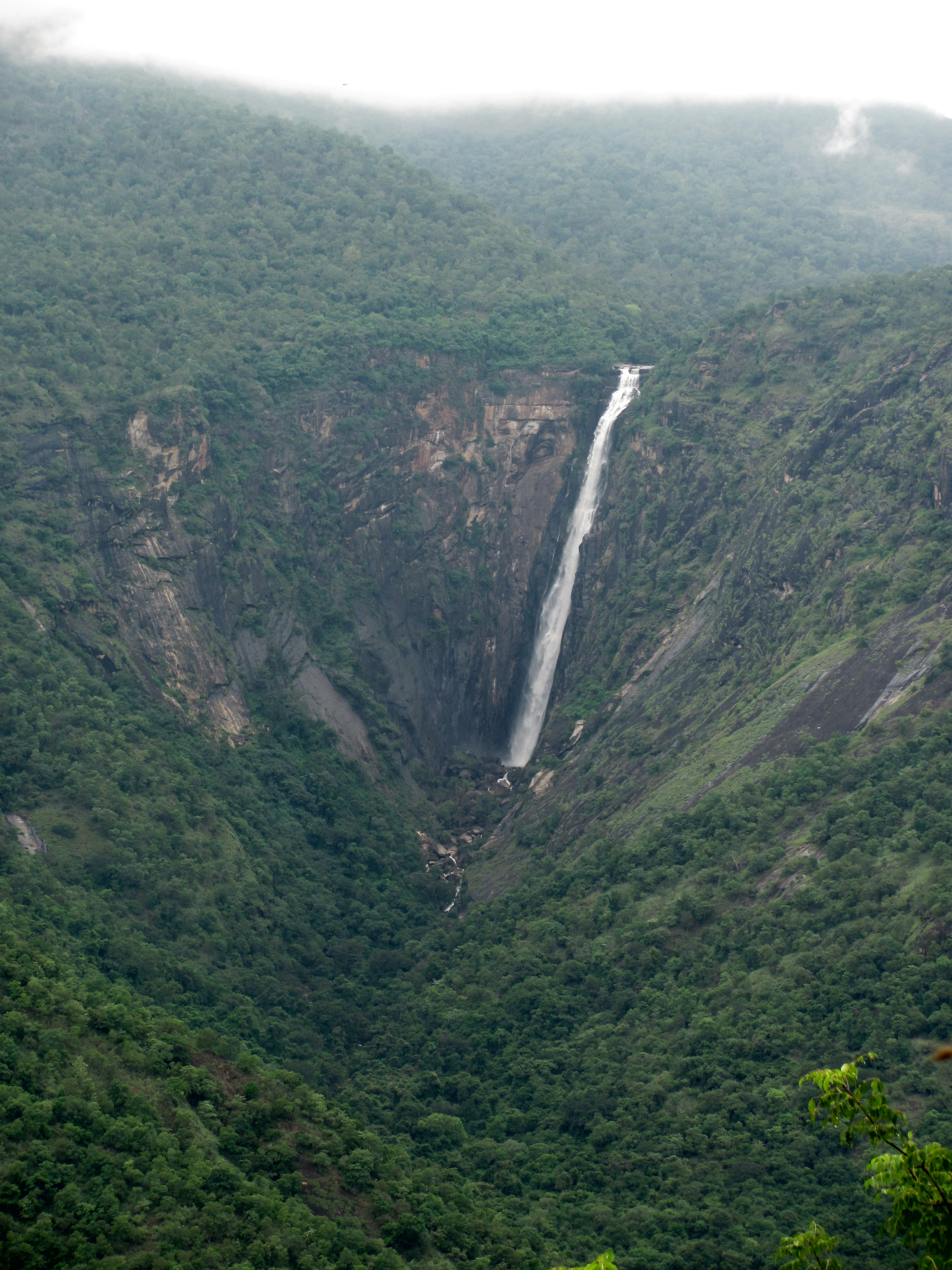
12. Thaliar Falls 975 feet (297 m) high

=== History ===
The Palani Hills are formed of pre-Cambrian gneisses, charnockites and schists; they are among the oldest mountain ranges in India. The park is an eastward extension of the Western Ghats hills formed by separation of the India-Madagascar-Seychelles blocks of East Gondwana in the Early Cretaceous period about 120 million years ago.

It is surrounded to the north, east and south by the Deccan Plateau formed later in the massive Deccan Traps eruption 66 million years ago as India drifted over the Reunion Hotspot.

=== Mountains ===
The Palani hills are most prominent towards the west, ranging from 1,800 metres (5,900 ft) to 2,553 metres (8,376 ft) (5,906 ft - 8,376 ft). The ten most prominent peaks are:

1. Vandaravu 2,553 metres (8,376 ft),
2. Ibex Peak 2,517 metres (8,258 ft)
3. Vembadi Peak 2,505 metres (8,219 ft),
4. Gundar 2,461 metres (8,074 ft),
5. Karunmakadu 2,451 metres (8,041 ft),
6. Sandana Parai 2,404 metres (7,887 ft)
7. Venkombu 2,327 metres (7,635 ft)
8. Tina Vardi 2,270 metres (7,450 ft),
9. Perumal Malai 2,236 metres (7,336 ft),
10. Vellari Malai 2,229 metres (7,313 ft)

The hill station of Kodaikanal stands in a 2,195 m (7,202 ft) high basin at the southern edge of the central part. The eastern end of the park is made of hills 1000–1500 m (3,281 ft - 4,921 ft) high.

The Tamil Nadu Department of Geology and Mining has completed detailed Geo-Technical Studies of the Palni Hills determining moderate to high landslide danger in much of the area.

=== Waterfalls ===
There are many waterfalls throughout the park which are popular tourist attractions. Some of the prominent falls associated with the park are: (Distances are referenced from km 0.0 at the bund (dam) on northeast end of Kodaikanal lake at .)

1. Alanthoni Falls at 20 metres (66 ft) high, elevation 590 metres (1,940 ft) in Manjampatti Valley, core area of Indira Gandhi National Park, between Talinji and Manjampatti villages on the Ten Ar River, public access restricted.
2. Bamen Falls
3. Bear Shola Falls at 2 kilometres (1.2 mi) from Kodaikanal,
4. Fairy Falls at 5 kilometres (3.1 mi) from Kodaikanal),
5. Glen Falls at Vilpatti on Palar (Kallar) River
6. Gundar Falls at A dangerous sheer cliff that drops over 100 metres (330 ft), to the first level, then drops off a couple more times to the plains.
7. Neptune Falls and Pool at, 400 metres (1,300 ft) are down a pine needle path through large pines beginning on left of road .5 kilometres (0.31 mi) past Forest Dept. Nursery, 14 kilometres (8.7 mi) from Kodaikanal on Poombrai Road.
8. Palar Upper Falls also called Anju Veedu Falls (Five House Falls), 85 metres (279 ft) photo, photo, on Palar stream 5.5 km southeast of Palar Reservoir and 1.7 km downstream north from Ganesha Puram village, per 1974 survey map. 27 kilometres (17 mi) from Kodaikanal), in the Vilpatti Range. Spectacular waterfalls with dangerous currents. This stream originates in the Kodaikanal lake.
9. Palar Lower falls 103 metres (338 ft) photo, photo, on Palar stream 5.5 km southeast of Palar Reservoir and 1.7 km downstream north from Ganesha Puram village, per 1974 survey map. 27 kilometres (17 mi) from Kodaikanal), in the Vilpatti Range. Spectacular waterfalls with dangerous currents. This stream originates in the Kodaikanal lake.
10. Poombarai Falls
11. Pambar Falls (also called Liril or Vatakanal) at, elevation 2,120 metres (6,960 ft), is 3 kilometres (1.9 mi) SE from Kodaikanal.
12. Silver Cascade at 55 metres (180 ft) high, is 8 kilometres (5.0 mi) from Kodaikanal) on the Ghat Road.
13. Skamba Falls at is 8 kilometres (5.0 mi) NE from Kodaikanal).
14. Snake Falls Just below Pambar Falls where Levigne stream comes out of Pambar Shola. Is particularly visible from Priests Walk and from top end of Coolie Ghat just below Shenbuganour.
15. Thalaiyar Falls, (Rat Tail Falls) at, elevation 820 metres (2,690 ft), is 975 feet (297 m) (297 meters) high. It is the highest waterfall in Tamil Nadu and the third highest in India.
16. Gaur Vellaiyan Falls at, 52 feet (16 m) high, is along the Kilavarai trail between Kilavarai and intersection 11 with Kodaikanal–Munnar Road, 40 kilometres (25 mi) from Kodaikanal.
17. Kathirikkai Falls is at, elevation 2,270 metres (7,450 ft). There is small pool above this 50 m (160 ft) waterfall just southwest of the Kodaikanal–Munnar Road crossing the Kathirikkai Odei (the Second Trout Stream) 2.2 kilometres (1.4 mi) west of the Forest Dept Hut.
18. Unnamed Falls at is on Dolphins Nose Trail.
19. Unnamed Falls 16m at, 16 metres (52 ft) high, is 2 kilometres (1.2 mi) southwest of Vandaravu Peak in remote southwest corner of Palani Hills.
20. Kudiraiyar River Falls at Kookkal Kombai, 90 metres (300 ft) high, is 4 kilometres (2.5 mi) walk northwest of Kukkal.
21. Kukkal Falls unnamed? at .6 kilometres (0.37 mi) southwest of Kukkal village center
22. Polur Falls (போளூர் அருவி) at .
23. Poondi Falls at estimated from Army Map and contours
24. Kumbakarai Falls located in the lower Palni foothills, along the Kodai-Vellagavi-Periyakulam footpath. These falls have two stages. At the first stage water collects in huge rock recesses which are each named after wild animals such as tiger, elephant and snake. The Pambar river then flows .5 kilometres (0.31 mi) to the second stage before falling as the main waterfall. Bathing is allowed. There is a bus from Periyakulam with fare of Rs. 5(6.00,7.00 13.00,15.30,16.30 hrs).
25. Unnamed Falls 10m, in Allinagaram Reserved Forest, elevation 2,220 metres (7,280 ft), location estimated from Map
26. Unnamed Falls 15m height 15 metres (49 ft), elevation 2,170 metres (7,120 ft), location estimated from Map

Name	Height	Location	Details
Ananthoni Falls	20 metres (66 ft)		between Talinji and Manjampatti villages on the Ten Ar River in Manjampatti Valley, core area of Indira Gandhi National Park, public access restricted.|

== Climate ==
Kodaikanal, India

Climate chart (precipitation, max. and min. temperature)
J	F	M	A	M	J	J	A	S	O	N	D
59 18 8	35 19 9	53 20 10	136 21 12	146 21 13	98 19 12	122 18 11	153 18 11	186 18 11	254 17 11	235 16 10	141 17 9
- █ Average max. and min. temperatures in °C
- █ Precipitation totals in mm
- Source: Indian Meteorological Department
Imperial conversion
J	F	M	A	M	J	J	A	S	O	N	D
2.3 64 47	1.4 65 47	2.1 68 50	5.4 69 53	5.8 70 55	3.8 66 54	4.8 64 53	6 64 52	7.3 65 52	10 63 51	9.3 62 49	5.6 62 48
- █ Average max. and min. temperatures in °F
- █ Precipitation totals in inches

The Palani Hills have a montane tropical monsoon climate which varies from west to east. Generally, as one proceeds from the Kerala border in the west to the foothills in the east, average rainfall decreases and temperature increases. Compared to the Deccan Plateau and the southwestern coastal plains, temperatures vary from moderate to quite cool. In the central Palani Hills at Kodaikanal, during March to May, the temperature range is between 10.1 and 20.9 °C (50.2 and 69.6 °F). The temperature can rise to a high of 35 °C (95 °F). During December to February it is between 8.1 and 18.6 °C (46.6 and 65.5 °F). In January, night temperatures sometimes drop below freezing, and thin ice is seen on lake edges in the early morning.

The climate of the upper Palnis has four clearly defined seasons:

- the dry season, usually between January and March, during which rain is scarce and limited to around 10 rainy days, the air is crisp, dry and cold, and when ground frost occurs;
- The warm season of April and May when most tourists arrive for their holiday in the hills and when summer showers and rain may fall on 18 to 20 days;
- The Southwest monsoon season extends between June and September, with around 45 days of rainfall spread over the four months;
- The Northeast monsoon season from October through early December, when rain is abundant and occurs over 30 or more days. Depending on the timing of the northeast monsoon, the latter half of December may experience a few days of heavy rain or remain completely dry.

The average annual rainfall is 1,617 millimetres (63.7 in), mostly during the north-east monsoon.

== Tribes ==
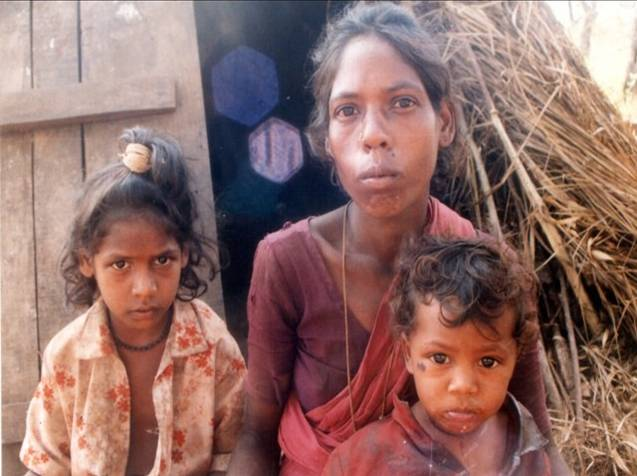
Paliyan woman & children.

Nomadic Paliyan tribes people have been seen living in some of the several caves in Manjampatti Valley. Paliyan people can be seen near Kukal Cave. The Tamil speaking Pulayan are referred to as the MalaPulayans, a group categorized as scheduled caste by State government of Tamil Nadu. Their traditional livelihood is foraging yams and small gaming in the nearby forest areas combined with cultivation of several species of minor millets in small plots located near their hamlets to meet their subsistence requirements.

They live in small hamlets in huts and government constructed colonies. The sedentary life started with the construction of group houses by the government in the early sixties. The community is vertically divided into two sub divisions called Koora and Kanni, further subdivided into 47 sub sects. Each sub sect is called Kootams, which regulates certain social events. Each kootam has its own deity, which is common to the entire group and once yearly the members of the same kootam assemble to worship the deity.

Many native tribals in the Palani Hills have partially assimilated modern culture but are marginalized on the fringes of society. Their social, economic and physical survival has become a difficult challenge for them and several public and private agencies. Their ancient culture in this area is well documented.

Relics and artifacts of the Paliyan tribes people can be seen in the Shenbaganur Museum.

== Ecoregions ==
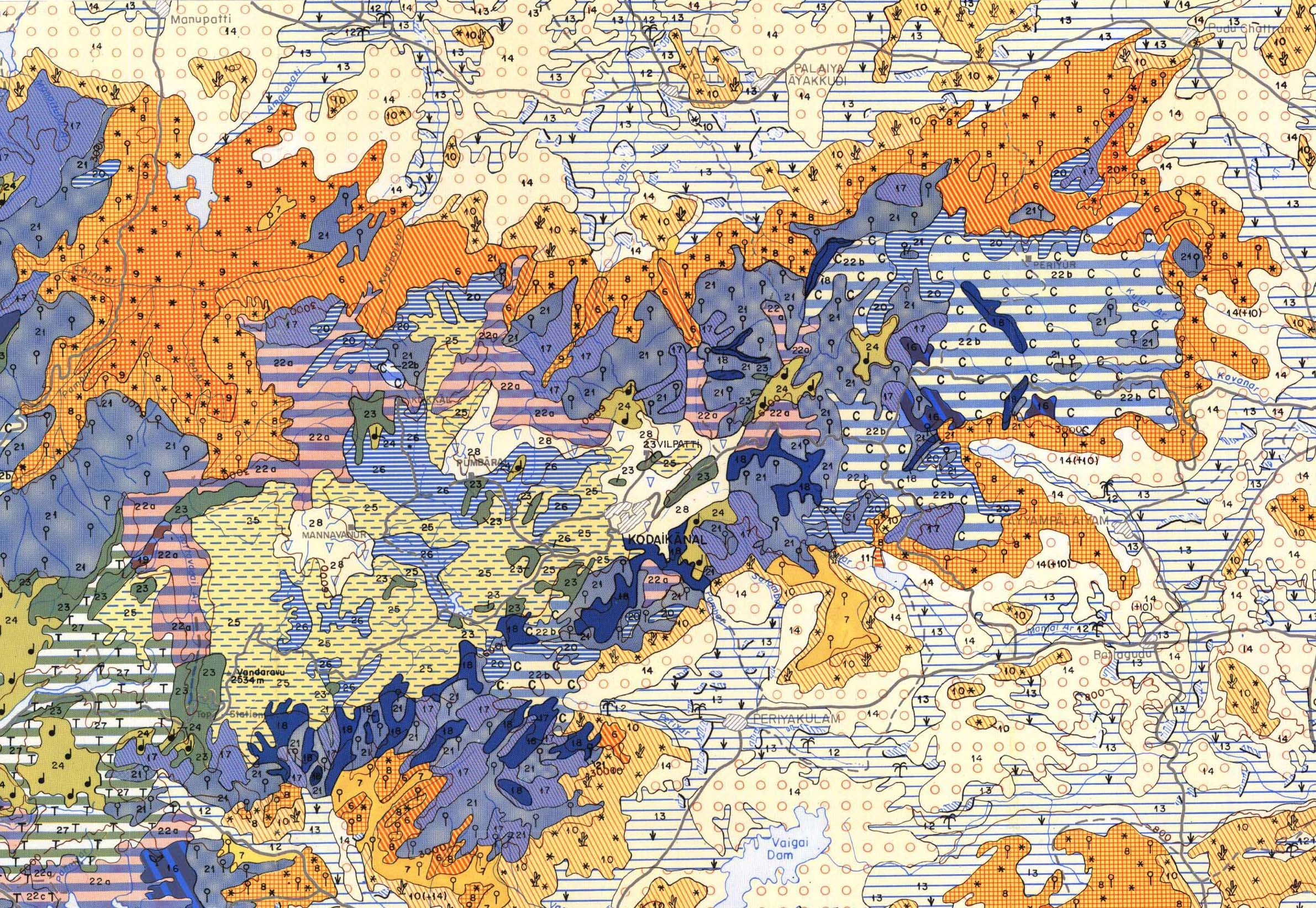
Palani Hills Vegetation MapFull Map with Legend:

The Palani hills are the easternmost part of the Western Ghats of India, which is one of the 25 biodiversity hotspots of the world. Some of the very rare and endangered plants and animals of India are found here. including intact relics of primary indigenous vegetation and a large number of non-native plants.

The hills may be divided into four distinct vertical zones comprising distinct Ecoregions with a wide diversity of Endemic species.

1. The foothills from 400 to 800 metres (1,300 to 2,600 ft) consist mostly of Deccan thorn scrub forests and South Deccan Plateau dry deciduous forests. There is also some evergreen forest along streams and rivers at these altitudes.
2. Between 800 and 1,600 metres (2,600 and 5,200 ft) is dominated by South Western Ghats moist deciduous forests accompanied by shrub savannah, although most has been converted to plantations.
3. From 1,600 to 2,000 metres (5,200 to 6,600 ft) are upper montane slopes characterised by shola-grassland mosaic, composed of frost-tolerant montane grasslands on the hills interspersed with pockets of dense shola forests in the valleys. This is an undulating plateau interspersed with occasional peaks.
4. Peaks rising to over 2,500 metres (8,200 ft) with total area of 385 square kilometres (149 sq mi) and average elevation of 2,200 metres (7,200 ft) consist mostly of montane grasslands interspersed with sholas. The grassland component is now largely replaced by forest plantations of wattle, pine and some eucalyptus .

== Flora and fauna ==
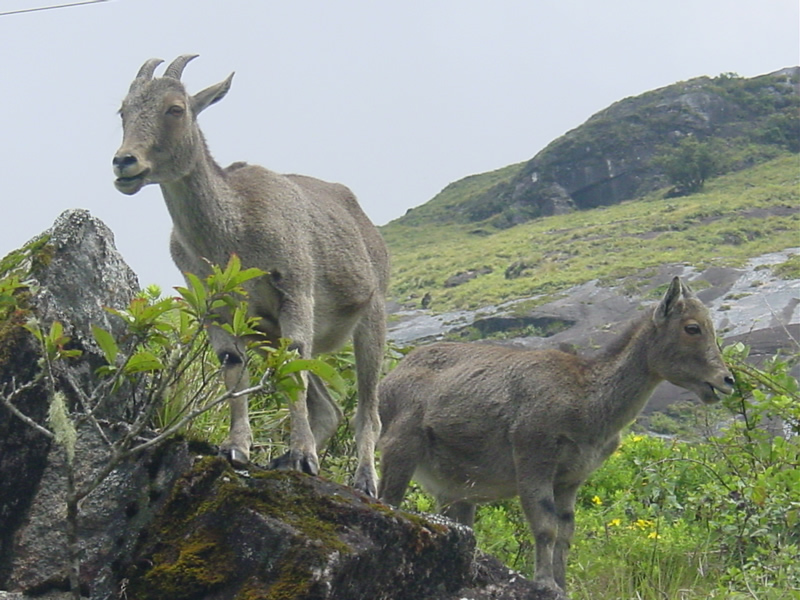
Nilgiri tahr

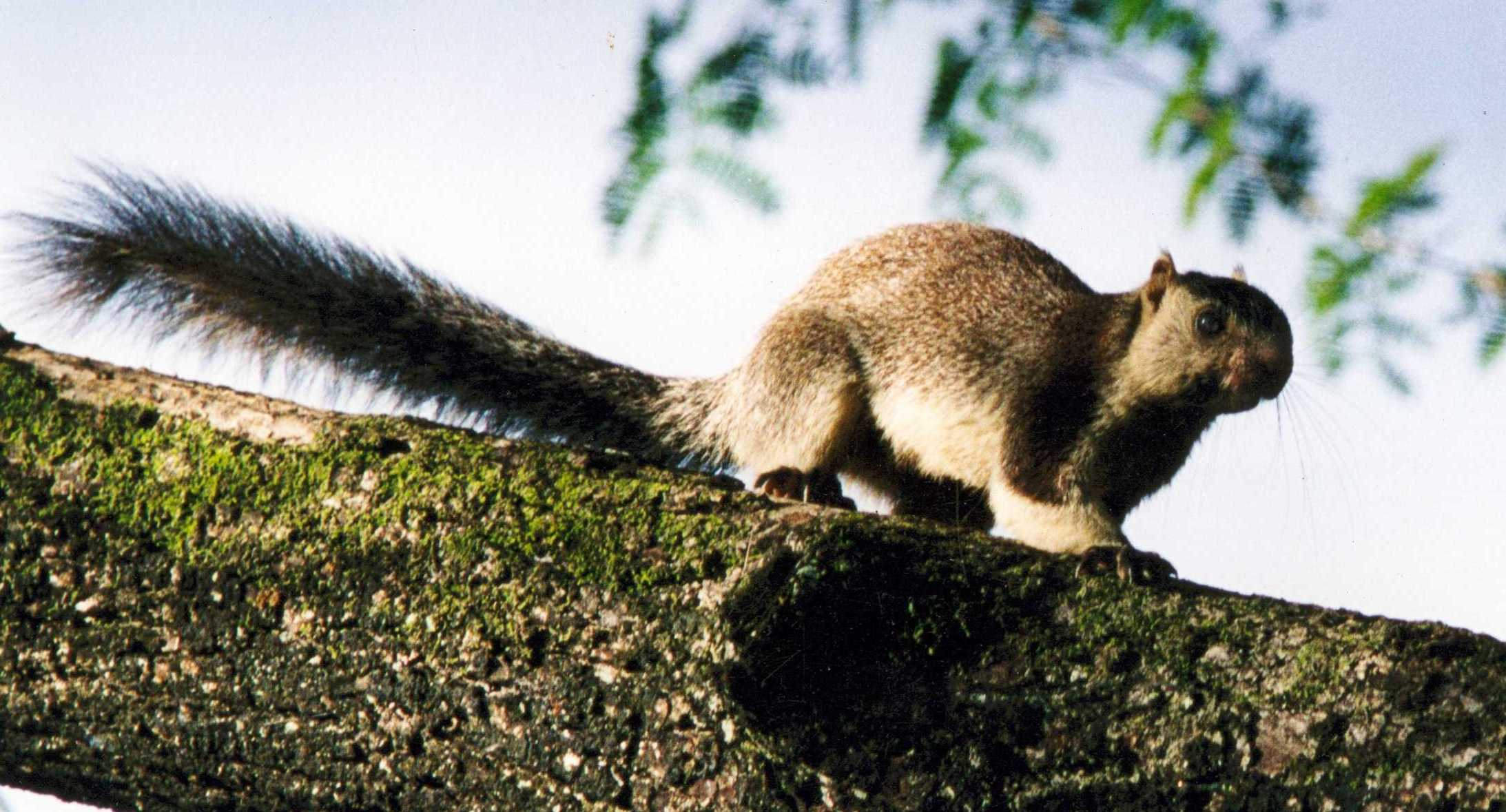
Grizzled giant squirrel

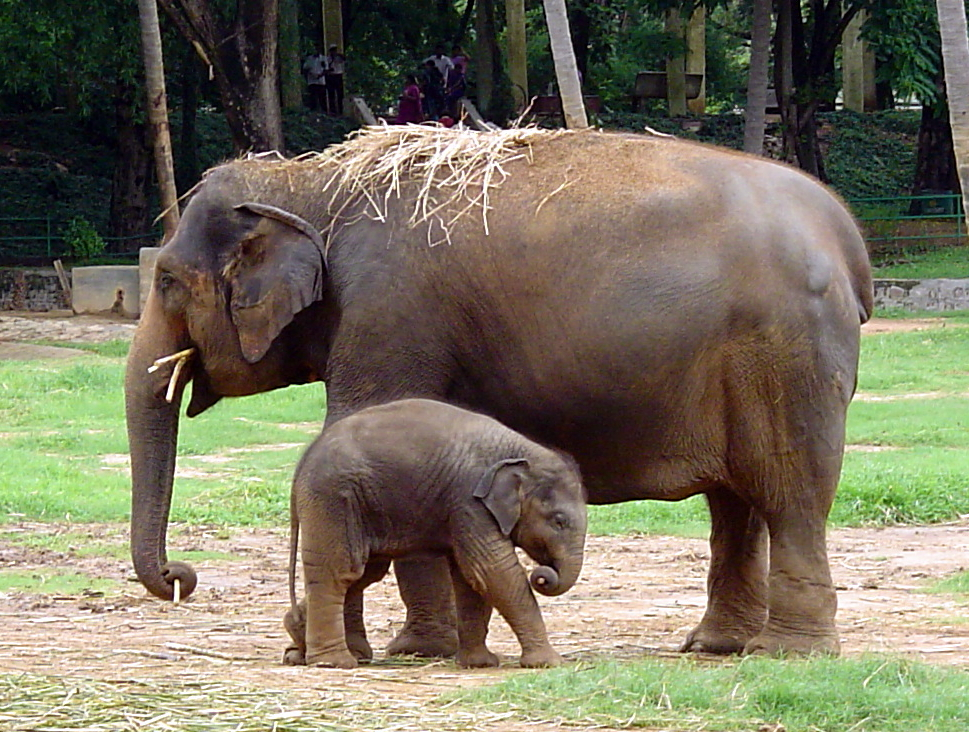
Indian elephant

Mammals: Wild are common in areas away from human habitation and cultivation.

Threatened species in the park area include: Bengal tiger, Indian elephant, Indian leopard, gaur (wild ox), Nilgiri tahr and grizzled giant squirrel.

Endangered Bengal tiger populations in the adjacent Project Tiger reserves of Anamalai Tiger Reserve and the Kalakkad Mundanthurai Tiger Reserve in the Agasthyamalai hills could expand back into this area when it is better protected. In February 2010, tigers were sighted in Kodaikanal forests during a six-day carnivore signs survey. A tigress and her cub were spotted playing in the wild. Forest Department officials are studying survey data to estimate the local tiger population based on indirect evidence like pug marks, scats and scratches.Amphibians and reptiles: Several little-known and endemic species of amphibians like Raorchestes dubois, Ghatixalus asterops, Micrixalus nigraventris, Indirana leptodactyla, Nyctibatrachus deccanensis and reptiles like Salea anamallayana, Hemidactylus anamallensis, Kaestlea palnica, Kaestlea travancorica, Ristella rurkii, Platyplectrurus madurensis, Teretrurus rhodogaster, Uropeltis pulneyensis, Uropeltis broughami, Uropeltis woodmasoni, Ahaetulla dispar, Boiga dightoni and Trimeresurus macrolepis occur in this sanctuary. Other more widespread species of herpetofauna also occur lower down.

Plants:

'Ceropegia sp.'

Moist areas exist along the ravines and in the sheltered pockets of high elevation shola forests around 2,000 metres (6,600 ft). These sholas are often hotspots of endemic plant life. Notable among these is Pambar Shola. The Pambar Shola, draining to the Pambar River, is now reduced to less than 3 kilometres (1.9 mi) in circumference. It contains several rare and endemic plant species including: Sonerila pulneyensis: a delicate Melastomataceae succulent herb endemic to Pambar Shola, Hoya wightii ssp. pulneyensis: a succulent vine with waxy flowers endemic to Pambar Shola', Plectranthus bourneate: a succulent herb endemic to Pambar Shola, Trichoglottis tenera: an epiphytic orchid. Pambar Shola is its major habitat, Phyllanthus chandrabosei: a shrub endemic to Pambar Shola, Huperzia sp.: a fern ally endemic to Pambar Shola, Selaginella sp.: a delicate creeping fern endemic to Pambar Shola, Psydraxficiformis: a tree, until recently thought extinct, Utleria salicifolia: only one clump known on the Palni hills, Elaeocarpus blascoi: a tree believed extinct until this year, Cyathea crinita: tree fern, highly endangered (Botanical Survey of India), Aeschynanthus perrottetii: known only from one other shola in the Palni hills, Eulophia sp.: a new species for the Palni hills first collected in April 2000,Actinodapohne bourneae: Laurel tree believed extinct (Botanical Survey of India). Two trees found in Pambar Shola, Ceropegia thwaitesii: vine, vulnerable, endemic to Pambar shola, Pimpinella pulneyensis: scarce, Exacum anamallayannum: gentian, only one other known location in Palni hills.

The comprehensive source on Palani Hills flora is currently in print: "The Flora of the Palni Hills, South India" by K.M. Matthew (1999), Tiruchirapalli, 3 vols., xcvi, 1880 p., figs., maps, $193 (set). ISBN 81-900539-3-0. Contents:

- Volume I ISBN 81-900539-4-9: Polypetalae: Dedication. Preface. Novelties in this Flora. Precursory or related publications. References. Introduction. I. The Palni hills: 1. Location and physical features. 2. Kodaikanal: taluk and town. 3. Rivers. 4. Roads. 5. Table 2: Gazetteer of localities. 6. Climatic conditions at Kodaikanal. 7. Geology and soils. 8. History. 9. The vegetation: A. Native; B. Alien. 10. References. II. Plant explorations on the Palnis: 1. Past explorations: 1. The Bournes. 2. The Fysons. 3. The Shembaganur team. 4. Natural History Centre at Shembaganur (SHC). 5. Recent explorations. 6. References. 2. Present exploration: 1. Background and scope. 2. Field trip report. 3. Phytogeographical findings. 4. Ethnobotany. 5. Nature conservation. 3. The present Flora: Format and conventions. Acknowledgments. Family sequence. Key to families. Dicotyledones: I. Polypetalae: 1. Ranunculaceae. 2. Alangiaceae.
- Volume II ISBN 81-900539-5-7: Gamopetalae: 1. Caprifoliaceae. 2. Labiatae. III. Monochlamvdeae: 1. Plantaginaceae. 2. Salicaceae.
- Volume III ISBN 81-900539-6-5: Monocotyledones: 1. Orchidaceae. 2. Gramineae. II. Gymnospermae: 1. Gnetaceae. 2. Cycadaceae.

Kurinji flowers (Strobilanthes kunthiana) which blossom in spectacular fields of violet only once in 12 years are threatened.

== Threat aversion ==
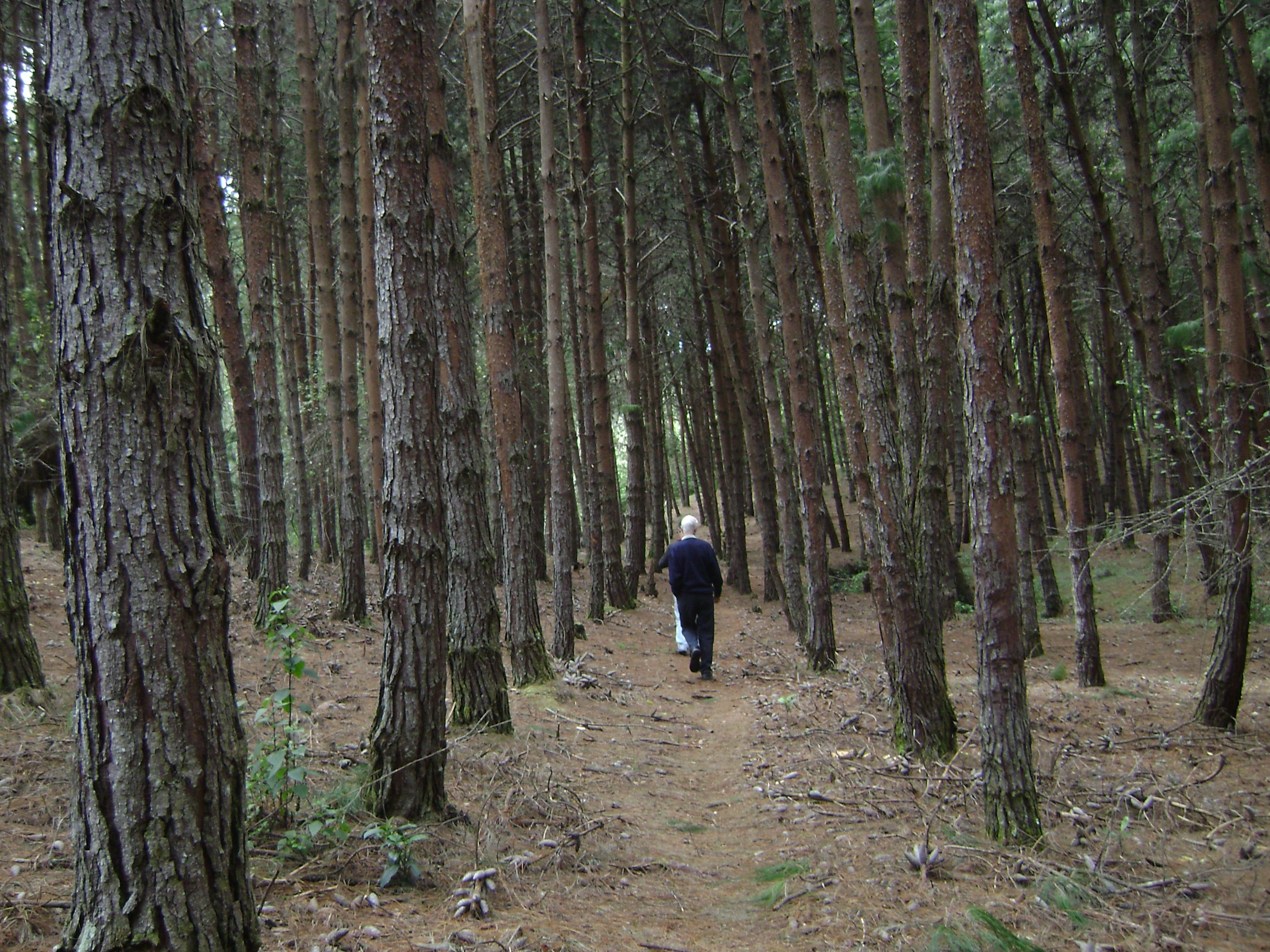
Monoculture pine plantation near Bear Shola

There is decreasing biodiversity, deforestation, grasslands destruction, monoculture tree plantations, and invasive exotic plant species in the park. There is sewage pollution, solid waste pollution and mercury contamination. There is also sound pollution, visual pollution, uncontrolled tourism, overdevelopment and lake eutrophication in and near Kodaikanal town. The Government of Tamil Nadu and several local NGO conservation groups are actively working to reduce some of these threats:

- The Government of Tamil Nadu completed establishment of a litter free zone and awareness campaign in Kodaikanal in 2000 at a cost of Rs 1. lakh.
- The Tamil Nadu Water Supply and Drainage Board, the Public Works Department and the local bodies are executing Bioremediation of Kodaikanal Lake under the National Lake Conservation Programme, with an expenditure of Rs.33.90 lakhs incurred till 2007.
- The Tamil Nadu Forest Dept. is implementing forest maintenance and restoration works over a period of 5 years from 2006 to 2007. Government of Tamil Nadu has sanctioned a sum of Rs.30.00 crores for the following components:
  - Conservation and eco-restoration of degraded forests in Nilgiris and Palani Hills. During 2007–2008, it is proposed to take up degraded sholas over an extent of 3 square kilometres and to carry out other maintenance and improvement works at a cost of Rs. 590.75 lakhs.
  - Improvement of roads in the forest areas of Tamil Nadu.
  - Bio-diversity conservation.
  - Maintenance and special repairs to Forest Department buildings.
  - Raising shola seedlings for afforestation.

A sum of Rs.1327.50 lakhs has been released for this purpose during 2006–2007.

- The Palani Hills Conservation Council (PHCC) was formed by concerned residents in 1985 One of its first goals was to support and push for the creation of a national park or a wildlife sanctuary in the Palni Hills. Zafar Futehally and M.S. Viraraghavan were its leaders. The PHCC made a clear connection between natural forests and water security and coined the phrase: "The health of the hills is the wealth of the plains." The PHCC generated a National Park proposal used by the Tamil Nadu Forest Department. One of the council's major contributions has been the creation of nurseries for indigenous trees. Today, thanks to its efforts, young shola trees thrive at Kodai institutions and in private gardens. The organisation sought to restrict unsustainable building development in the 1990s. The PHCC has been active in the case against mercury contamination of the once beautiful Pambar Shola.,
- The Vattakanal Conservation Trust promotes the conservation of Palni Hills' native plants and habitats by raising plant nurseries, establishing conservation gardens, working with the Forest Department to restore habitats and acquiring properties to ensure survival of specific species and ecosystems
- Kodaikanal International School supports and leads environmental initiatives in the surrounding area. It offers an International Baccalaureate Program course on Environmental Systems.
- The Save Kurinji Campaign Council organises campaigns and programmes for conservation of the Kurinji plant and its habit.
- The Tamil Nadu Green Movement works on Nature Education, Conservation awareness, Judicial intervention, media awareness and works with other NGOs in the Western Ghats.
- Elephant Valley at Vilpatti, 8 km NW of Kodaikanal, is a 100-acre (0.40 km^{2}) private nature reserve and organic farm welcoming eco-tourists. They promote the conservation of traditional varieties of fruits, vegetables and cereals, including vegetables of all colours, shapes and sizes and orchards of lime, orange, avocados, guavas and amla intercropped with coffee, pepper, vanilla, cinnamon, nutmeg, mangoes, jack fruit, pomegranate, guavas and bananas.

== Visitor information ==
The Kodaikanal Division Forest Office offers a book called Kodaikanal Beauty in Wilderness, which has a list and map of local treks in the Kodaikanal area. Several trekking destinations are accessible from the Kodaikanal–Munnar Road. Permission from the Forest Department is necessary to visit areas deep inside the forests and for trekking in forests. Forest rest houses are available with advance reservation at Kodaikkanal, Poombarai, Kukkal, Kavunji, Berijam and Devadanapatty. Contact: District Forest officer, Kodaikkanal Forest Division, Kodaikanal, Dindigal District, Tamil Nadu, India. (open 10 am to 6 pm) Phone : 91-4542-240287
