= Marugalpatty =

- Village
- Location in Tamil Nadu, India
- Coordinates: 10°4′57.0216″N 77°39′58.068″E
- Country: India
- State: Tamil Nadu
- District: Theni

Population
  - Total: 500

Languages
  - Official: Tamil
- Time zone: UTC+5:30 (IST)
- PIN: 625602
- Telephone code: 04546

Marugalpatty is a village in Theni District, in the southern state of Tamil Nadu, India. It is located western 18 km from Periyakulam and south 15 km from Andipatti.
