= T.Subbulapuram =

- Village
- Location in Tamil Nadu, India T.Subbulapuram (India)
- Coordinates: 10°0′52.03″N 77°39′22.37″E
- Country: India
- State: Tamil Nadu
- District: Theni

Languages
  - Official: Tamil
- Time zone: UTC+5:30 (IST)

T.Subbulapuram is a village in Andipatti Taluk in Theni District, Tamil Nadu State, India. It is located around 5 kilometres (3.1 miles) from the town of Andipatti, 20 kilometres (12 miles) from Theni, and 57 kilometres (35 miles) from Madurai.

== History ==
The village of T.Subbulapuram is one of the oldest villages in the state of Tamil Nadu, dating back to the 8th century. The initial "T" denotes that the village comes under the Thimmarasanaickanur division (a collection of villages). This village has the second largest number of voters in the Aundipatti Assembly, as well as in Theni Lok Sabha constituency in the Theni District of Tamil Nadu. The main occupations of local residents are farming and weaving. The village is famous for its Khadi (woven) products. The economy is driven by agriculture; their staples are rice, cotton, ragi (millet) and cholam, and vegetables such as tomato, brinjal, drumstick, and chillies.

== Economy ==
Farming is the main source of employment, followed by weaving. There are many hand loom and power loom companies in the village. These are the main sources of income for the people of T.Subbulapuram.

== Schools ==
- Panchayat Union Elementary School - From 1st Standard to 5th Standard - instruction in Tamil
- Government Higher Secondary School - From 6th Standard to 12th Standard - instruction in Tamil and English also

== Temples and festivals ==
=== Temples ===
T.Subbulapuram has many temples including: Sri Kannan Kovil, Sri Sandhanamaari Amman Temple, Sri Bhathrakali Amman Temple, Sri Bhagavathi Amman Temple, Sri Kandhanatha Swamy Temple, Sri Thandayuthapani Temple, Nalimalai Pillaiyar Temple, Kaliamman and Vinayaga Temples, Sri Kaliammam and Mariamman Temple, Sri Mangaththaiamman Temple, Sri Valagurunathan and Angalaeshwari Madasamy Temple, Sri Kaliamman and Vinayaga Temple, Jakkammal Kovil, Sri Pethanasamy and Sri Maalaiammal Kovil Temple, and East street Mallar Samuthaya Mariyamman and Kaliyamman Temple. Oorkalan temple, Madasamy temple, **Mallaieswaran Temple ( mallar (pallar) samuthaya paththiya sontha kovil)**, and one CSI church

=== Festivals ===
Panguni pongal and Kandha Sashti are very famous festivals held in the village. Panguni pongal is celebrated every year during the last week of the Tamil month Panguni in honour of Sri Bathrakali Amman, Sri Bhagavadhi Amman, and Sri Kaliamman.

Kandha Sashti is celebrated in the month of Karthikai, in the week of Diwali. The Kilakku theru Sri Mariamman Temple Festival is occurs in the month of Panguni.

The Sri Sandhanamaari Amman festival (Mulai pari, Theechatti, Pookkuli) is celebrated in the middle or last week of Chithirai.

Durga Pooja festival is an annual Hindu festival in the Indian subcontinent that celebrates the goddess Durga. It is observed on the sixth day of Ashwin Shukla Paksha, the seventh day of Ashwin Shukla Paksha (in Bihar) and ends on the tenth day of Ashwin Shukla Paksha.

Krishna Jayanthi (Janmastami) and Manikkasamy Swamy Pooja are also very famous. Mega Yaga Pooja and Mega Annathana Pooja are large celebrations. Around 3000 people participate in the event. The Sri Kalaiamman festival is conducted on North Street in the month of Panguni. Then Sri Mangaththayammal kovil Kumbhabhisegam event was conducted on 11,12 May 2014 and more than 3000 peoples participated. The Sri Pethanasamy and Sri Maalaiammal Kovil Kumbhabhisegam events were conducted on 24 May 2013 and saw more than 5000 people participating.

== Facilities ==
There are poor transport facilities to the nearest town, Aundipatty. These are only share Auto service and one State bus service from Theni and Periyakulam . A Post Office is present, as are two banks (South Indian Bank, Indian Overseas Bank), and there is a primary health centre, a veterinary hospital, library, and yoga centre. There are leading chettinad cotton sarees suppliers are there in this village.
