= Anaimalayanpatty =

- Village
- Location within Tamil Nadu Location within India
- Coordinates: 9°46′58″N 77°20′42″E
- Country: India
- State: Tamil Nadu
- District: Theni
- Subdistrict: Uthamapalayam

Population
  - Total: 8,000
- Time zone: UTC+05:30 (IST)

Anaimalayanpatty is a village under Uthamapalayam Taluk, Theni District, Tamil Nadu, India. The population of village would be around 8,000.
