= A. Perumal (artist) =

Indian artist (1915–2004)

A. Perumal (1915 – 2004) was an Indian artist associated with the Bengal School of Art. Known for his efforts to make art accessible to tribal communities in and around Shantiniketan, he worked extensively as a painter and sculptor.

Perumal was born in Ammapatti, a village near Uthamapalayam in Theni district, Tamil Nadu. After losing his parents at a young age, he faced significant challenges but excelled in his studies. At 16, he was sent to Shantiniketan by a local freedom fighter. At Shantiniketan, he studied under Rabindranath Tagore and received training from artists Benode Behari Mukherjee and Nandalal Bose.

Perumal’s body of work included paintings, sculptures, murals, and frescoes created using various media such as watercolors, tempera, ink, wood, and ceramic tiles. His art often depicted Indian landscapes, rural life, and tribal culture, reflecting the stylistic influences of the Bengal School.

Committed to making art accessible, Perumal painted murals on the walls of tribal huts in Santhal villages, creating what his mentor Nandalal Bose referred to as a "wayside gallery." These murals were intended to integrate art into the daily lives of local communities. Perumal did not hold formal exhibitions or sell his work, as he believed his art belonged to the public rather than private collectors. His works were preserved posthumously, primarily through the efforts of the Aravind Eye Hospital in Madurai.

He spent much of his career at Kalabhavan, Shantiniketan’s art school, where he served as a faculty member for nearly four decades. In addition to his visual art, Perumal contributed to art literature by translating Nandalal Bose’s book on art into Tamil under the title Theneer Kalai.

One of Perumal’s significant contributions is his involvement in the illustrations for the Constitution of India. Part 19 of the Constitution, which deals with Miscellaneous provisions, features an illustration of Netaji Subhas Chandra Bose saluting in military attire, surrounded by troops. The artwork includes Nandalal Bose's signature, with Perumal's signature visible in the lower-left corner.

In 1999, poet and art critic Indran published Taking His Art to Tribals: Art and Life of A. Perumal of Santiniketan, documenting his contributions. Perumal died in 2004.
