= SukkangalPatti =

- panchayat town
- Nickname: Skpatti
- Interactive map of SukkangalPatti
- Coordinates: 9.838514°N 77.432585°E
- Country: India
- State: Tamil Nadu
- District: Theni

Population (2001)
  - Total: 3,900

Languages
  - Official: Tamil
- Time zone: UTC+5:30 (IST)
- Postal code: 625540
- Telephone code: 04554
- Vehicle registration: 060
- Avg. summer temperature: 39.5 °C (103.1 °F)
- Avg. winter temperature: 25.8 °C (78.4 °F)
- Website: www.theni.tn.nic.in

Sukkangalpatti is a panchayat town in Theni district in the Indian state of Tamil Nadu.

== Geography ==
Sukkangalpatti is located in Cumbum Valley, also called Kambam Valley, is a valley in the Theni district of Tamil Nadu state in India near the Kerala state border. This is the most fertile valley in south India, The valley includes lands between Thekkadi Hills, Varusanadu Hills, and Kodaikanal Hills.It is well-connected by road to Chinnamanur & Theni.

Distance From Towns:
6 km from Chinnamanur.
25 km from Theni.
15 km from Cumbum.
107 km from Madurai. 12 km from Uthamapalayam.

== History ==
The former name of SukkangalPatti was Kalatchipuram .

== Economy ==
Its economy depends mostly on agriculture. The main produce of this village are grapes, bananas, coconut, onion, ivy gourd (Kovaikaai), tomato, drumstick and other food crops are cultivated.

It is one of the few remaining places in Tamil Nadu producing grapes.

== Water Resources ==
It is depends on ground water. The ground water level based on the two ponds like Thalamuthan Kanmai & Milagai Kulam.

Shanmuganathi Dam is the main water source for the Thalamuthan Kanmai.

== Educational institutions ==
Schools:
1.Kallar Primary School, Sukkangalpatti
2. Hindu Nadar Middle School, Sukkangalpatti
3. GoodSam Matriculation School, SukkangalPatti
4. Government Higher Secondary School, Odaipatti, SukkangalPatti

Colleges:
1.P.S.Muthu College Of Arts and Science, SukkangalPatti
2.P.S.Muthu College Of PhysicalEducation, SukkangalPatti

== Health Care Centre ==
1. GoodSam Medical Centre, SukkangalPatti
2. Government Hospital, OdaiPatti, SukkangalPatti

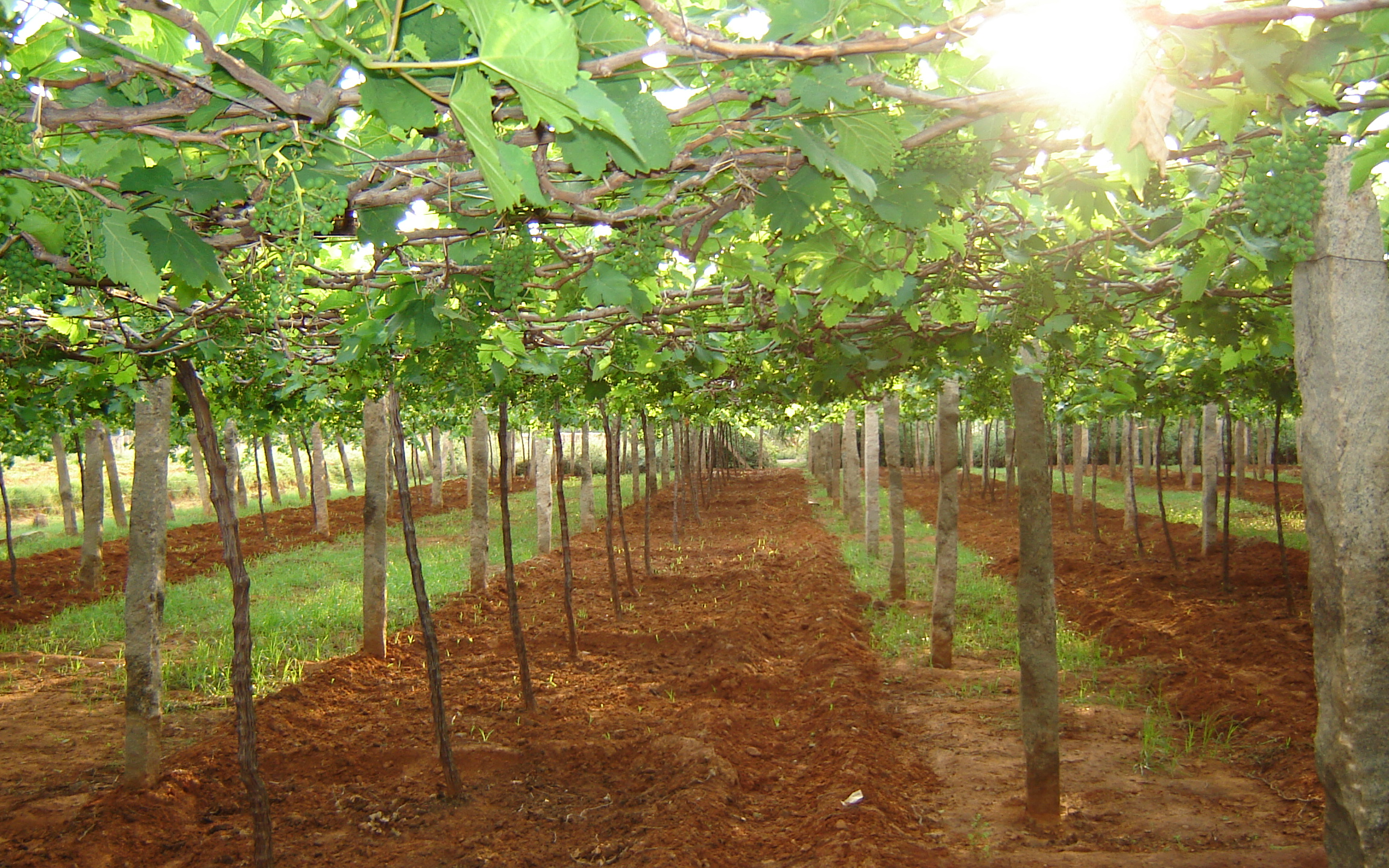
Grapes cultivation in SukkangalPatti.

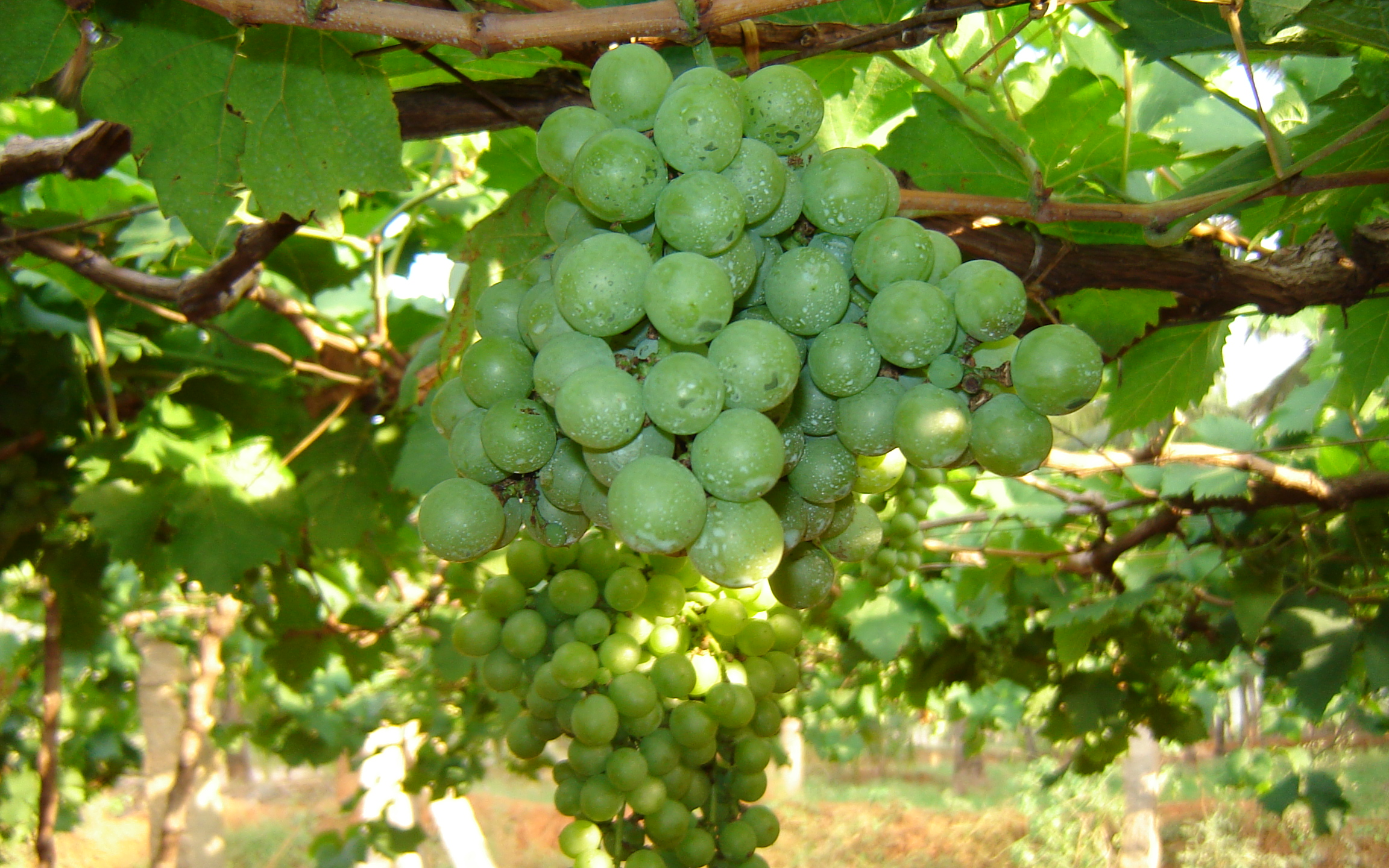
Grapes Cultivation.

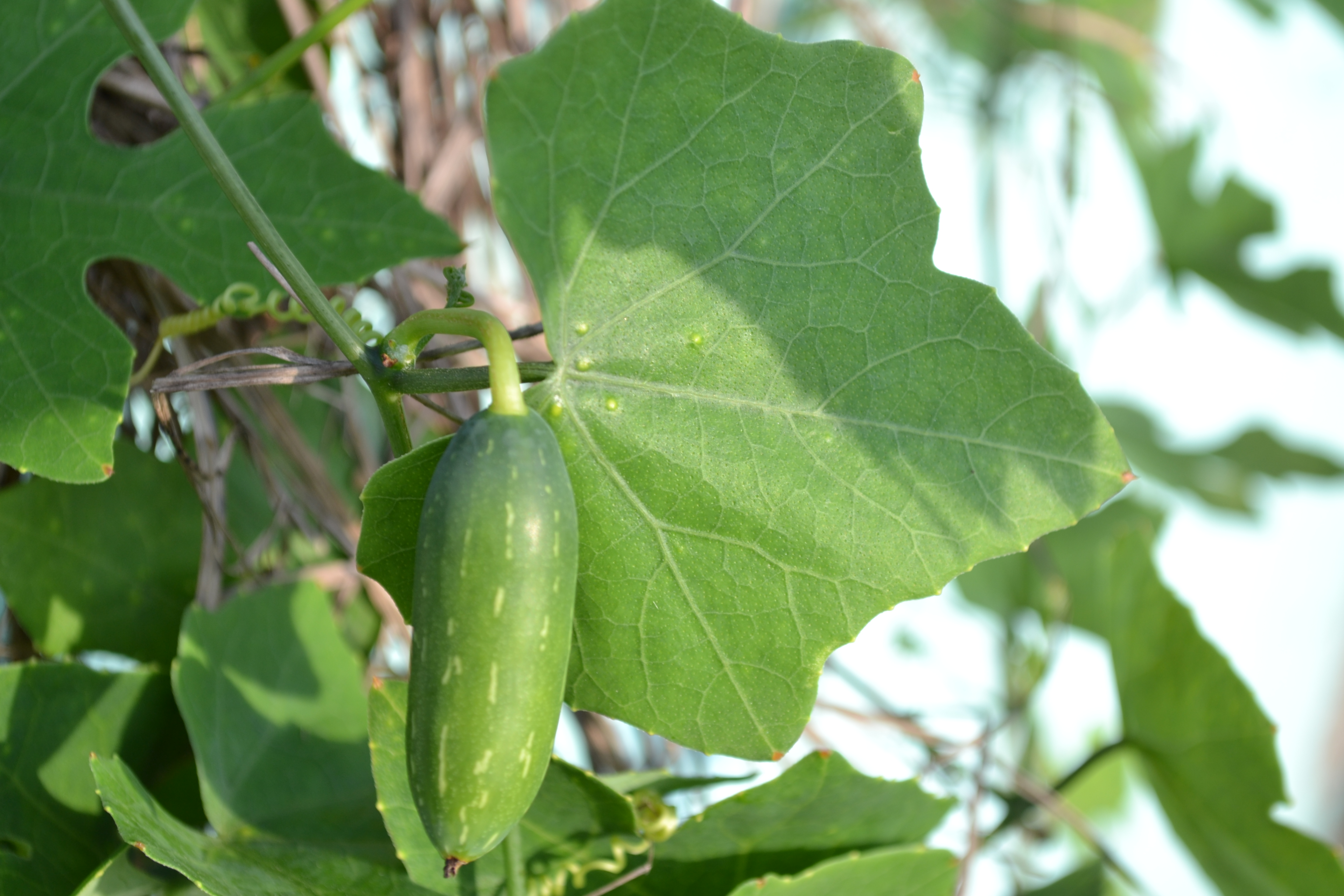
Ivy gourd(Kovaikaai)

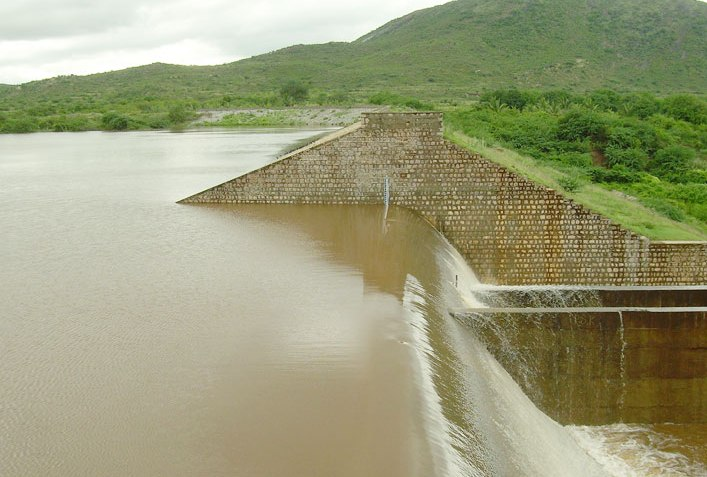
Shanmuganathi Dam

== Industries ==
1. The Southern fruits (Banana) Limited, SukkangalPatti
2. The R.P.Fruits Limited, SukkangalPatti

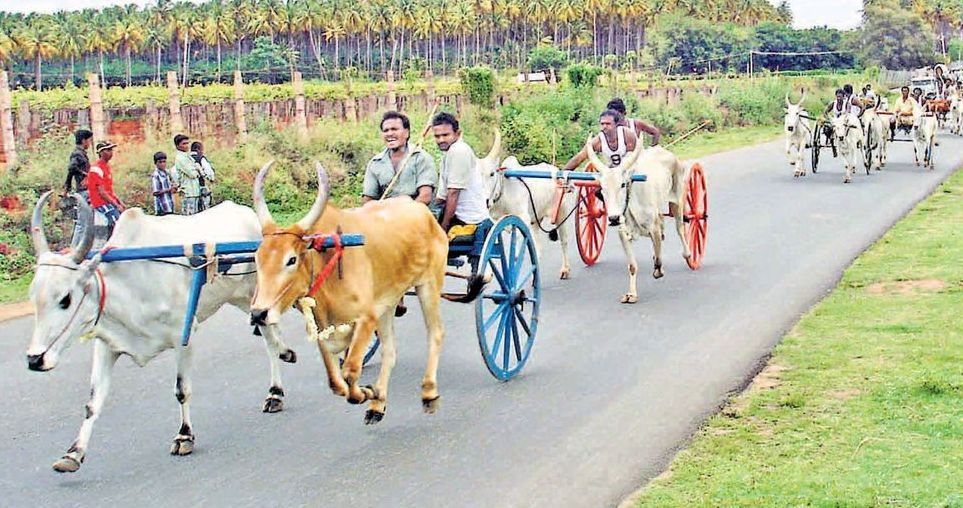
Bullock cart race held in SukkangalPatti

== Demographics ==
As of 2001 India census, Sukkangalpatti had a population of 2,116. Males constitute 50% of the population and females 50%. Sukkangalpatti has an average literacy rate of 64%, higher than the national average of 59.5%: male literacy is 76%, and female literacy is 52%. In Sukkangalpatti, 11% of the population is under 6 years of age. near 2 colleges are available.
