= Nesamithran =

Tamil poet and writer

- Born: 1979 (age 46–47); K. Puthupatti , Uthamapalayam taluk, Theni district, Tamil Nadu
- Other name: S. Thiruramsankar
- Occupations: Poet , Writer

Nesamithran is a Tamil poet and writer.

== Early life ==
He was born in K. Pudupatti, in the Uthamapalayam taluk of the Dindigul/Theni district in Tamil Nadu. he is a poet, fiction writer, translator, and social activist. His work primarily focuses on themes of feminism and the impact of science within the contemporary Indian context. His debut poetry collection, Cartoon Bommaikku Kural Koduppaval (The One Who Gives a Voice to a Cartoon Doll), explores the complexities of everyday life and the natural world.

== Works ==
Nesamithran has authored works of poetry and literature.He offers an enigmatic perspective on the universal dimensions of the human mind. Since 2010, he has served as the editor-in-chief of the little magazine 'Valasai'. This publication focuses on themes such as the politics of the body, LGBTQ issues, autism, violence against children, and the experiences of migrant artists.This year saw the release of two of his works: 'Uthirigalin Neelappadam'—a collection of critical essays on emerging Tamil poetry—and 'Manpuzhuvin Naangavathu Idhayam,' his second poetry collection. Additionally, he co-edited a collection of short stories titled 'Irandu Pixel Kuraivana Kadavul' (A God with Two Pixels Less), along with a volume of critical commentary on it. This book explores themes such as the existence and evolution of the third gender, the politics of the body, and diaspora literature.

== Books ==
Sources:

- "Cartoon Bommaikku Kural Koduppaval" (2010) – Uyirmei Pathippagam
- "Nannayam" (2019) – Zero Degree Publishing
- "Thudikkuthu" (2019) – Zero Degree Publishing
- "Pinnangalin Perasaivu" (2019) – Zero Degree Publishing
- "Ayal Magarandha Serkkai" (2019) – Zero Degree Publishing
- "Ayanipaathai" (2019) – Zero Degree Publishing
- "Engal Vizhithirukkum Piramidam" (2021) – Zero Degree Publishing
- "Zhagari" (2021) – Zero Degree Publishing
- "Kulavai" (2023) – Valasai Pathippagam
- "Hardingin Soodhattam" (2023) – Uyirmei Pathippagam
- "Dolphin-galin Uraiyadal" (2023) – Uyirmei Pathippagam
- "Jelly Meengal Karaiyodhungum Kadal" (2024) – Zero Degree Publishing
- "Manpuzhuvin Naangavathu Idhayam" (2024) – Zero Degree Publishing
- "Nallaangu" (2024) – Zero Degree Publishing

== Media Interviews ==
- “Kalai Enbadhu Kaaya Sandhigai” (Art is a Confluence of Wounds) – Uyirmei, Volume 22, Issue 5, May 2025.

== See also ==
- Tamil Nadu
- Tamil literature
