= Kalahastiswamy Temple, Uthamapalayam =

Hindu temple in Uthamapalayam, Tamil Nadu

Coordinates: 9.802571°N 77.335706°E

The Kalahastiswamy Temple is a Hindu temple located in the town of Uthamapalayam in Tamil Nadu, India. Dedicated to the god Shiva, the temple is believed to have been constructed by three warring kings who came to a compromise. The temple has paintings dating to the Madurai Nayak period.
