= Shanmuganathi Dam =

Dam in Tamil Nadu, India

Coordinates: 9.732078°N 77.35427°E

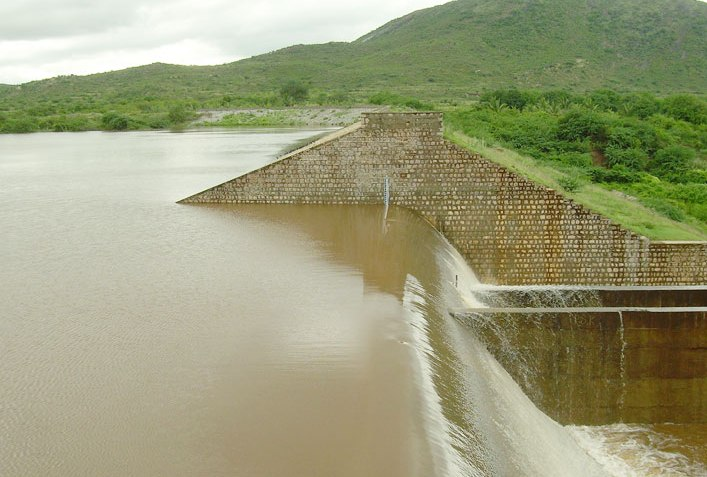
Shanmuganathi Dam

The Shanmuganathi Dam is built across the Shanmugha River near Rayapanpatty, in the Theni district of Tamil Nadu, southern India. It provides water for irrigation for the dry lands such as Pusarikoundan patti, Appipatti, SukkangalPatti, Vellaiammalpuram, Odaipatti and Sepalakottai of the Theni district. The dam is situated at the foot hill of Meghamalai mountain range just 4 km from Rayapanpatty Village near Uthamapalayam, and just 2km from Anaipatty village.
