= Andipatti Jakkampatti =

Andipatti Andipatti
- Town
- Nickname: Aundi
- Location in Tamil Nadu, India
- Coordinates: 9°59′46″N 77°37′24″E
- Country: India
- State: Tamil Nadu
- Zone: Madurai
- District: Theni district

Population (2014)
  - Total: 98,214

Languages
  - Official: Tamil
- Time zone: UTC+5:30 (IST)
- Postal code: 625512

Andipatti is a Panchayat town in Theni district, Madurai Region, At the state of Tamil Nadu, India.

== Demographics ==
As of 2001 India census, Andipatti Jakkampatti had a population of 22,992. Males constitute 51% of the population and females 49%. Andipatti Jakkampatti has an average literacy rate of 74%, higher than the national average of 59.5%; with 56% of the males and 44% of females literate. 11% of the population is under 6 years of age.

As of 2010, Hindu High School is the only secondary level school in this village. The locals of this village hosted a portal Aundipatty to post the village updates and events, especially for the natives who later moved on to different cities for making their livings. Now (2012 Jan 20) Hindu high school crossed the age of 100.
