= Mavoothu Vellappar Temple =

Mavoothu Vellappar Temple is a Hindu temple located in the town of Mavoothu in the Theni District of Tamil Nadu, India. The temple was constructed by the Kandamanur zamindar. The spring within the temple is believed to have curative powers.
