= Gudalur, Theni =

Gudalur Lower Camp
- Town
- Location in Tamil Nadu, India
- Coordinates: 9.68°N 77.27°E
- Country: India
- State: Tamil Nadu
- District: Theni
- Taluk: Uthamapalayam

Government
  - Type: Second Grade Municipality
  - Body: Gudalur Municipality
- Elevation: 340 m (1,120 ft)

Population (2011)
  - Total: 41,915

Languages
  - Official: Tamil
- Time zone: UTC+5:30 (IST)

Gudalur is a town in Theni district in the Indian state of Tamil Nadu. As of the 2011 census, its population was 41,915.

== Geography ==
Gudalur is located at 9.31°N 77.20°E. It has an average elevation of 340 m (1,120 ft).

== Demographics ==
Religious census
| Religion | Percent(%) |
| Hindu | 92.31% |
| Muslim | 5.25% |
| Christian | 2.34% |
| Sikh | 0.01% |
| Other | 0.1% |

According to the 2011 census, Gudalur had a population of 41,915 with a sex-ratio of 1,006 females for every 1,000 males, well above the national average of 929. A total of 3,355 were under the age of six, constituting 1,727 males and 1,628 females. Scheduled Castes and Scheduled Tribes accounted for 6.61% and .56% of the population respectively. The average literacy of the town was 66.83%, compared to the national average of 72.99%. The town had a total of 12,001 households. There were a total of 20,860 workers, comprising 799 cultivators, 13,578 main agricultural labourers, 637 in house hold industries, 4,206 other workers, 1,640 marginal workers, 22 marginal cultivators, 1,055 marginal agricultural labourers, 121 marginal workers in household industries and 442 other marginal workers.

As per the religious census of 2011, Gudalur (M) had 92.31% Hindus, 5.25% Muslims, 2.34% Christians, 0.01% Sikhs and 0.1% following other religions.

== History ==
Life here revolves around agriculture and almost everyone has something or the other to do with farming. This place is a village surrounded by paddy fields, vast expanses of arid land, diverse flora and fauna. Principal crops are paddy, pulses, coconut, grapes, vegetables, flowers and groundnut. Crops such as gingely and cotton are also extensively cultivated. Main source of water is from Periyar Dam. The Tamil Nadu government has built a memorial for Col. John Penny Cuick, who built the Mullai Periyar Dam at Lower Camp, near Gudalur.

The Azhagar Swamy Temple (Thiru koodal azhagiya perumal) is said to be over 1,000 years old but evidences prove that they are probably 500 years old. Example: It is built with the same architecture of Madurai Alagar temple.

The Mangaladevi Kottam, an ancient temple, which is dedicated to Kannagi, the Tamil goddess is situated very close to Gudalur. This temple site is under dispute between the Tamil Nadu and Kerala states and access to the temple is granted by the Kerala State only once every year.

The best time to visit this place is from June - Dec (Manson Season).
