= Kamayagoundanpatti =

Kamayagowdapatti
- Panchayat town
- Location in Tamil Nadu, India Kamayagowdapatti (India)
- Coordinates: 9°43′34″N 77°19′07″E
- Country: India
- State: தமிழ் நாடு
- District: Theni

Population (2011)
  - Total: 16,134

Tamil, Kannada, Telugu
  - Official: Tamil
- Time zone: UTC+5:30 (IST)
- Postal code: 625521
- Vehicle registration: TN 60

Kamayagowdapatti is a panchayat town in Theni district in the Indian state of Tamil Nadu.

== Demographics ==
As of 2001 India census, In 2007 Kamayagoundanpatti had a population of 12,165. Males constitute 48% of the population and females 52%. Kamayagoundanpatti has an average literacy rate of 61%, higher than the national average of 59.5%: male literacy is 69%, and female literacy is 54%. In Kamayagoundanpatti, 11% of the population is under 6 years of age.

It is 6 km south of Uthamapalayam and 4 km east of Cumbum, surrounded by Megamalai in the east and by western ghats of Suruli Hills in the south and Cumbum mettu hills in the west.
