= Uthamapalayam taluk =

Coordinates: 9.8°N 77.3333°E

Uthamapalayam taluk is a taluk of Theni district of the Indian state of Tamil Nadu. The headquarters of the taluk is the town of Uthamapalayam.

The taluk will be the home of India-based Neutrino Observatory.

== Demographics ==
According to the 2011 census, the taluk of Uthamapalayam had a population of 434,813 with 216,730 males and 218,083 females. There were 1006 women for every 1000 men. The taluk had a literacy rate of 71.64. Child population in the age group below 6 was 19,074 Males and 17,742 Females.
