= Kuchanur =

Kutchanur
- Town
- Location in Tamil Nadu, India
- Coordinates: 9°53′21″N 77°22′02″E
- Country: India
- State: Tamil Nadu
- District: Theni

Population (2001)
  - Total: 6,118

Languages
  - Official: Tamil
- Time zone: UTC+5:30 (IST)

Kuchanur is a panchayat town in Theni district in the Indian state of Tamil Nadu.

== Geography ==
The perennial river Surabi flows which carried the waters of Periyar river and Suruliyaru.

== Demographics ==
As of 2011 census of India, Kuchanur had a population of 6118. Males constitute 49% of the population and females 51%. Kuchanur has an average literacy rate of 59%, lower than the national average of 59.5%: male literacy is 69%, and female literacy is 49%. In Kuchanur, 11% of the population is under 6 years of age.
