= Anai patti =

- Village
- Location in Tamil Nadu, India Anai patti (India)
- Coordinates: 9.73°N 77.3°E
- Country: India
- State: Tamil Nadu
- District: Theni
- Elevation: 391 m (1,283 ft)

Languages
  - Official: Tamil
- Time zone: UTC+5:30 (IST)
- PIN: 625521
- Telephone code: 04554

Anai patti or Nagaiya Goundan patti is a village in the Theni district in the western part of the Indian state of Tamil Nadu.
