= Hanumanthampatti =

Hanumanthanpatti
- Town
- Location in Tamil Nadu, India Hanumanthanpatti (India)
- Coordinates: 9°47′45″N 77°17′30″E
- Country: India
- State: Tamil Nadu
- District: Theni

Population (2011)
  - Total: 9,436

Languages
  - Tamil Official: Tamil
- Time zone: UTC+5:30 (IST)
- Postal code: 625533

Hanumanthanpatti is a town panchayat located in Uthamapalayam taluk, Theni district in the state of Tamil Nadu, India.

== Demographics ==
At the 2001 India census, Hanumanthampatti had a population of 9,436 (males 50%; females 50%). Hanumanthampatti had an average literacy rate of 63%, higher than the national average of 59.5%. Male literacy was 73%, and female literacy was 54%. In Hanumanthampatti, 12% of the population were under 6 years of age.
