= Vaigai Dam =

Dam in Tamil Nadu, India

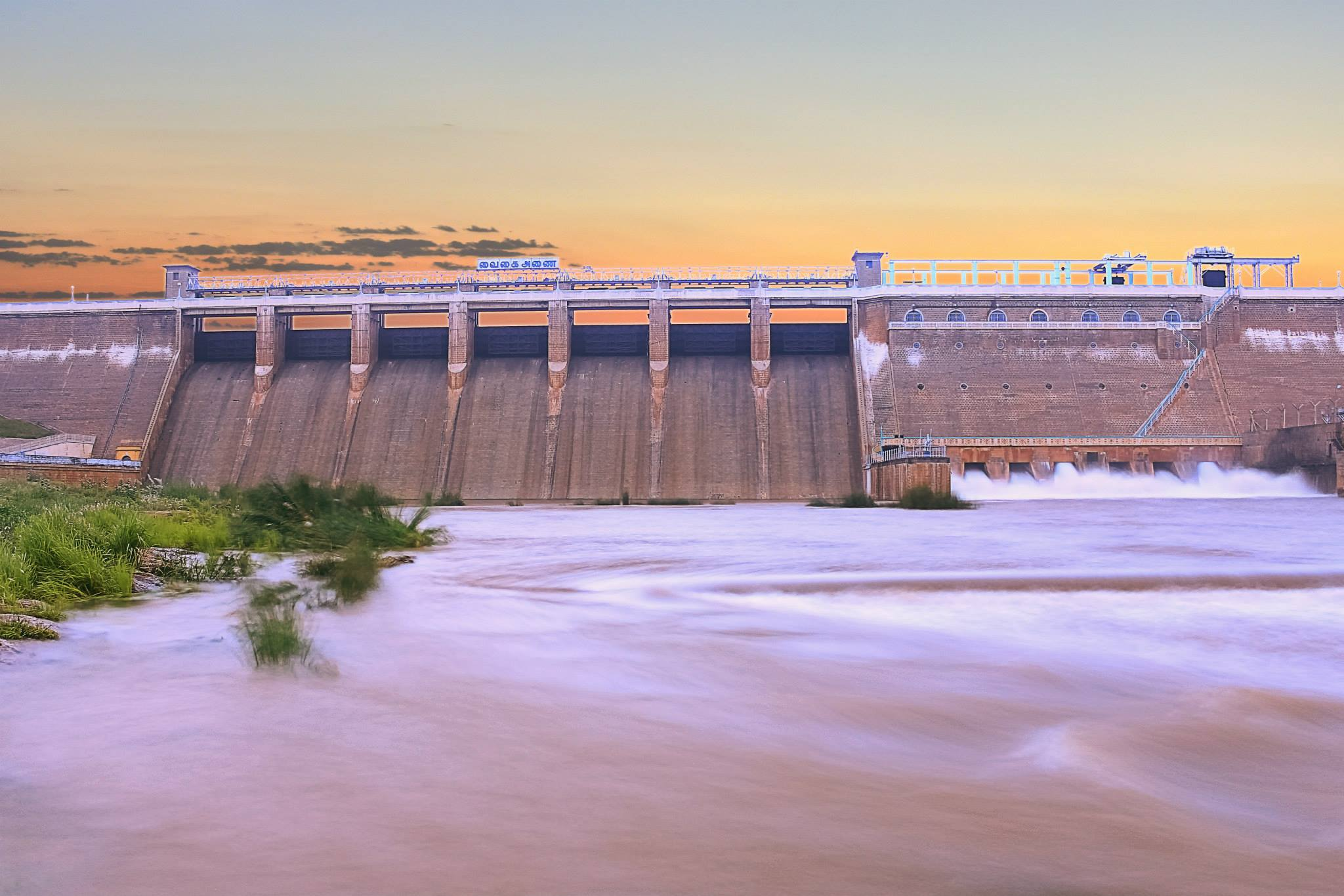

- Location of the Vaigai Dam in Tamil Nadu
- Official name: வைகை அணை
- Country: India
- Location: periyakulam, Theni district, Tamil Nadu
- Coordinates: 10°03′12″N 77°35′23″E
- Opening date: 29 January 1959

Dam and spillways
- Height: 33.8 m (111 ft)
- Length: 3,560 m (11,680 ft)

Reservoir
- Total capacity: 174,000,000 m^{3} (6.144752010×10^{9} ft^{3}) (6.14 tmc ft)

Power Station
- Operator: Tamil Nadu Green Energy Corporation Limited
- Commission date: 3 April 1990
- Type: Gravity dam
- Turbines: 2 x 3 MW
- Installed capacity: 6 MW

The Vaigai Dam is built across the Vaigai River near Andipatti, in the Theni district (Madurai district, before British India) of Tamil Nadu, South India. Near the dam, the Government of Tamil Nadu has constructed an Agricultural Research Station to research the cultivation of various crops, including rice, sorghum, black gram, cowpea and cotton.

== History ==
Vaigai Dam was inaugurated on 21 January 1959 by the then Chief Minister K. Kamaraj. It is one of the few dams not constructed between two mountains, so this dam completely depends on its concrete strength. The dam is the lifeline of farmers in six districts, namely Theni, Dindigul, Madurai, Sivagangai, Virudhunagar and Ramanathapuram. It provides water for irrigation in these districts and also serves as a source of drinking water for major cities such as Theni, Madurai, and Ramanathapuram, which lie along its riverbed.

== Capacity ==
Vaigai Dam measures 111 feet in height and can store water up to 71 feet, with a total storage capacity of 6,143 million cubic feet or 6.14 thousand million cubic feet.

== Maintenance ==
Vaigai Dam is maintained by Water Resources Department which in turn managed by the Tamil Nadu Public Works Department.

== Vaigai Dam Park ==
A small park that has a children’s play area is maintained on both sides of the dam. A small bridge connects the two sides of the park in front of the dam. A musical dancing fountain functions between 6:00 AM and 8:00 PM on weekends and during government holidays.

== Vaigai Dam Hydroelectric Power Plant ==
Vaigai Hydroelectric Power Plant was design capacity of 6 MW. It has 2 unit(s) of 3 MW each. The first unit was commissioned in 1990. It is operated by Tamil Nadu Green Energy Corporation Limited.

== Upcoming developments ==
Vaigai Dam is one of the 104 dams in Tamil Nadu that is proposed to be improved under the Dam Rehabilitation and Improvement Project ( DRIP).

== Transportation ==
By road:The dam is situated at 9 km from Andipatti, 14 km from Theni and 70 km from Madurai.

By train:The nearest railway station is Andipatti Railway station which is located 10 km away from the dam.

By air:The nearest airport is Madurai Airport(IXM) which is 80 km away from the Dam. Air connectivity is available from Chennai, Mumbai, Delhi, Hyderabad, and Vijayawada. International connectivity is available to Colombo, Dubai and Singapore.

== Gallery ==
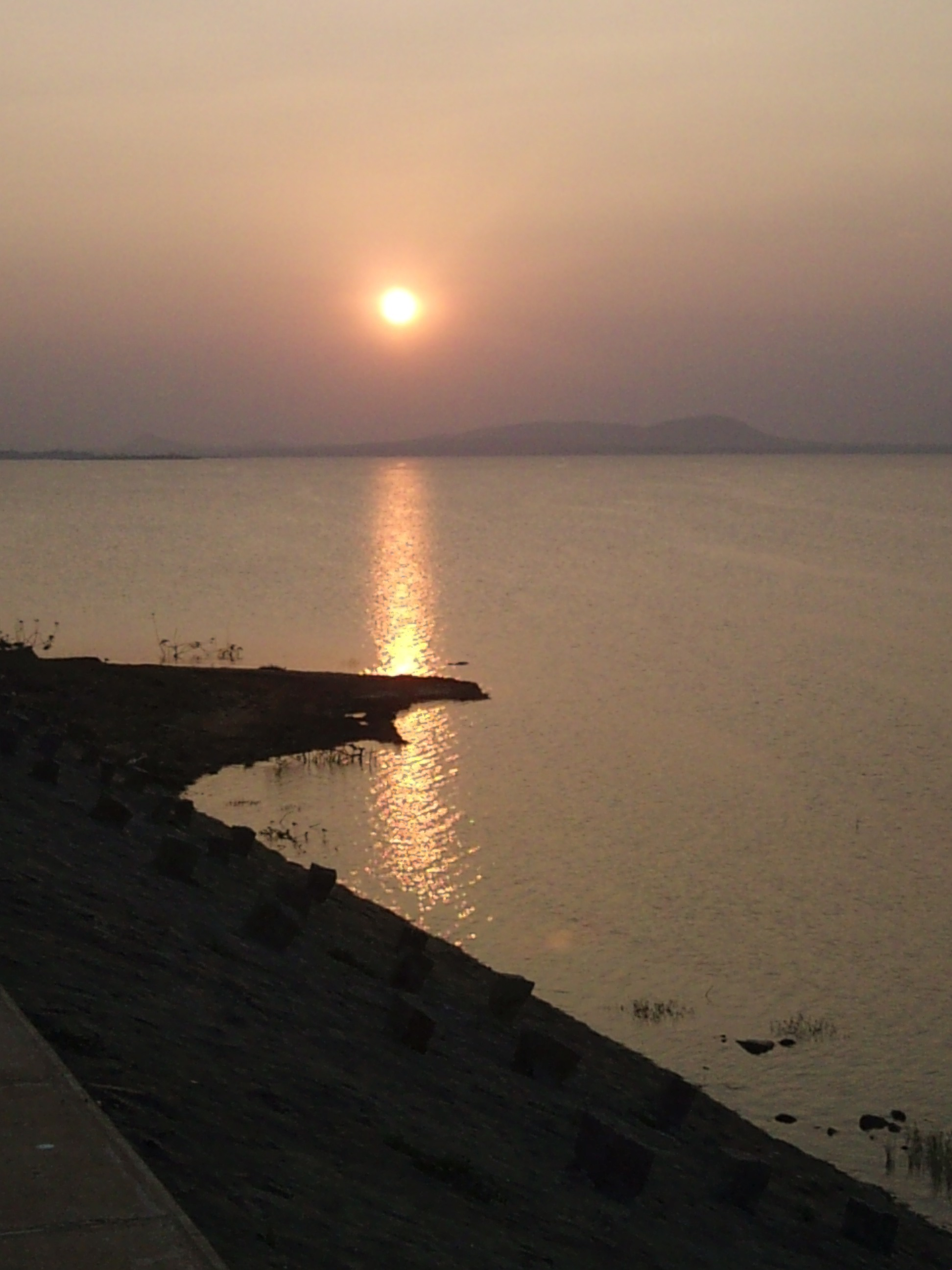
Vaigai Dam at Twilight

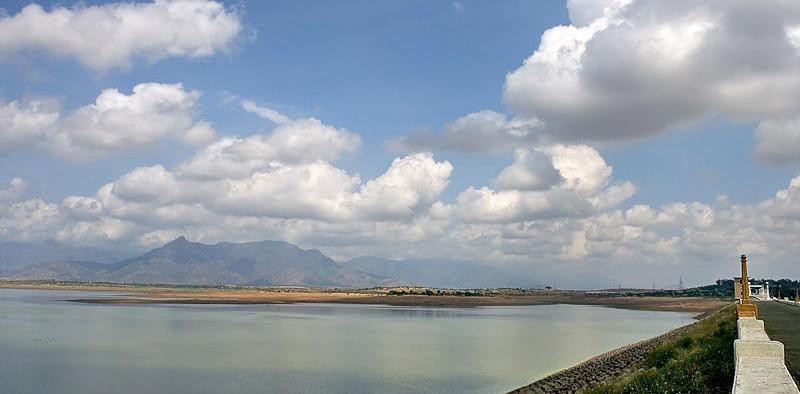
Vaigai Dam in the Daylight

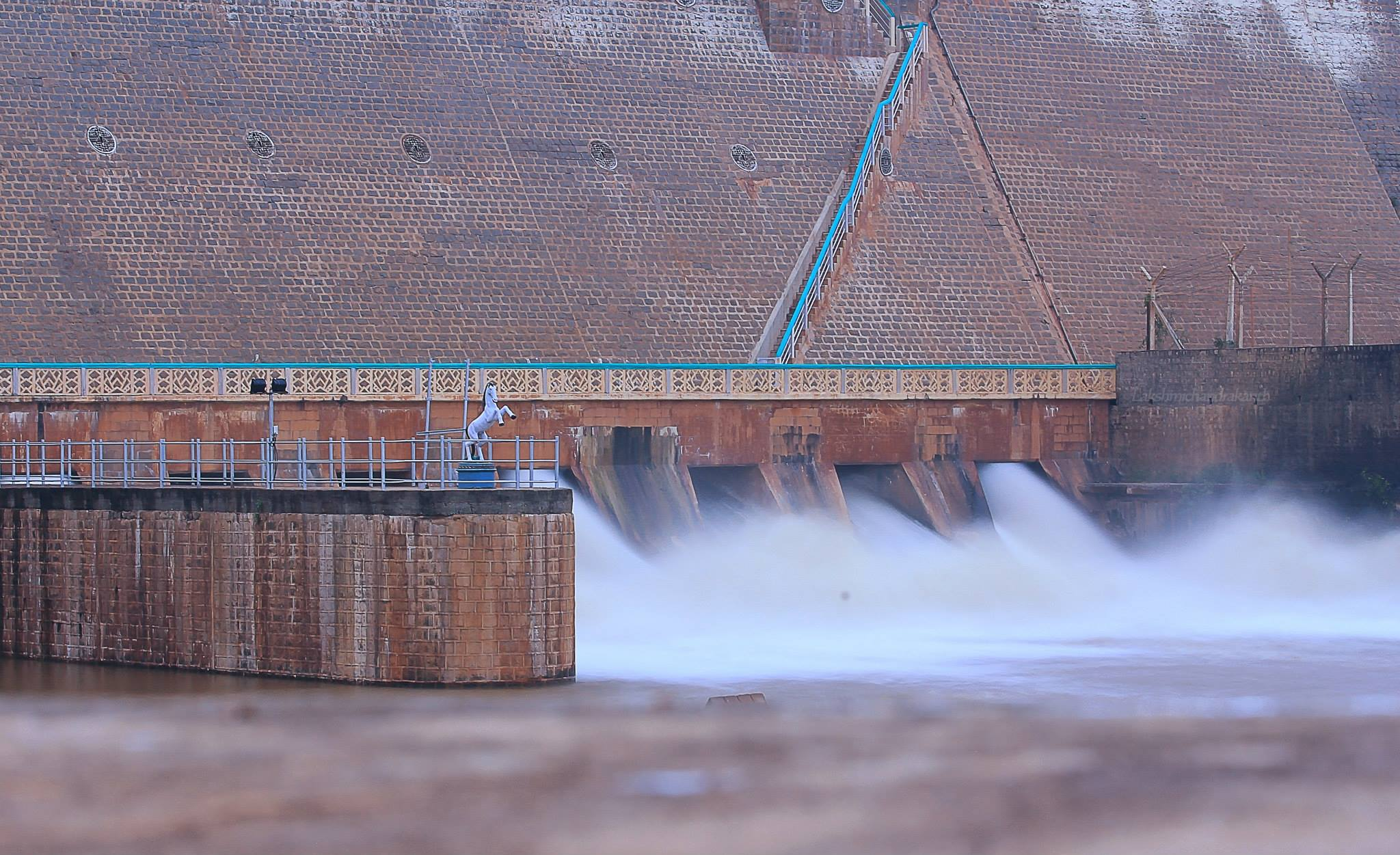
Vaigai dam closeup

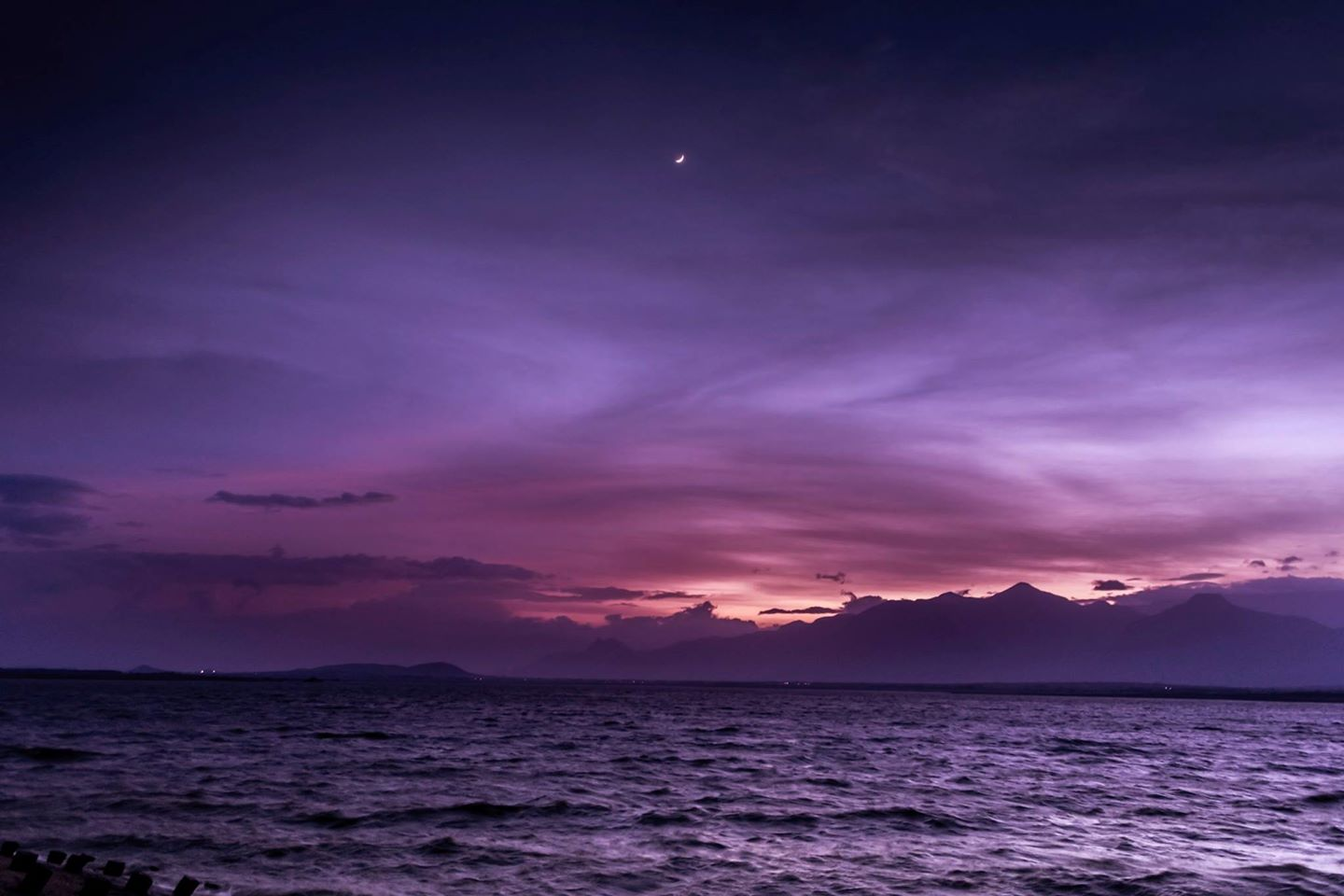
Vaigai dam backwater reservoir

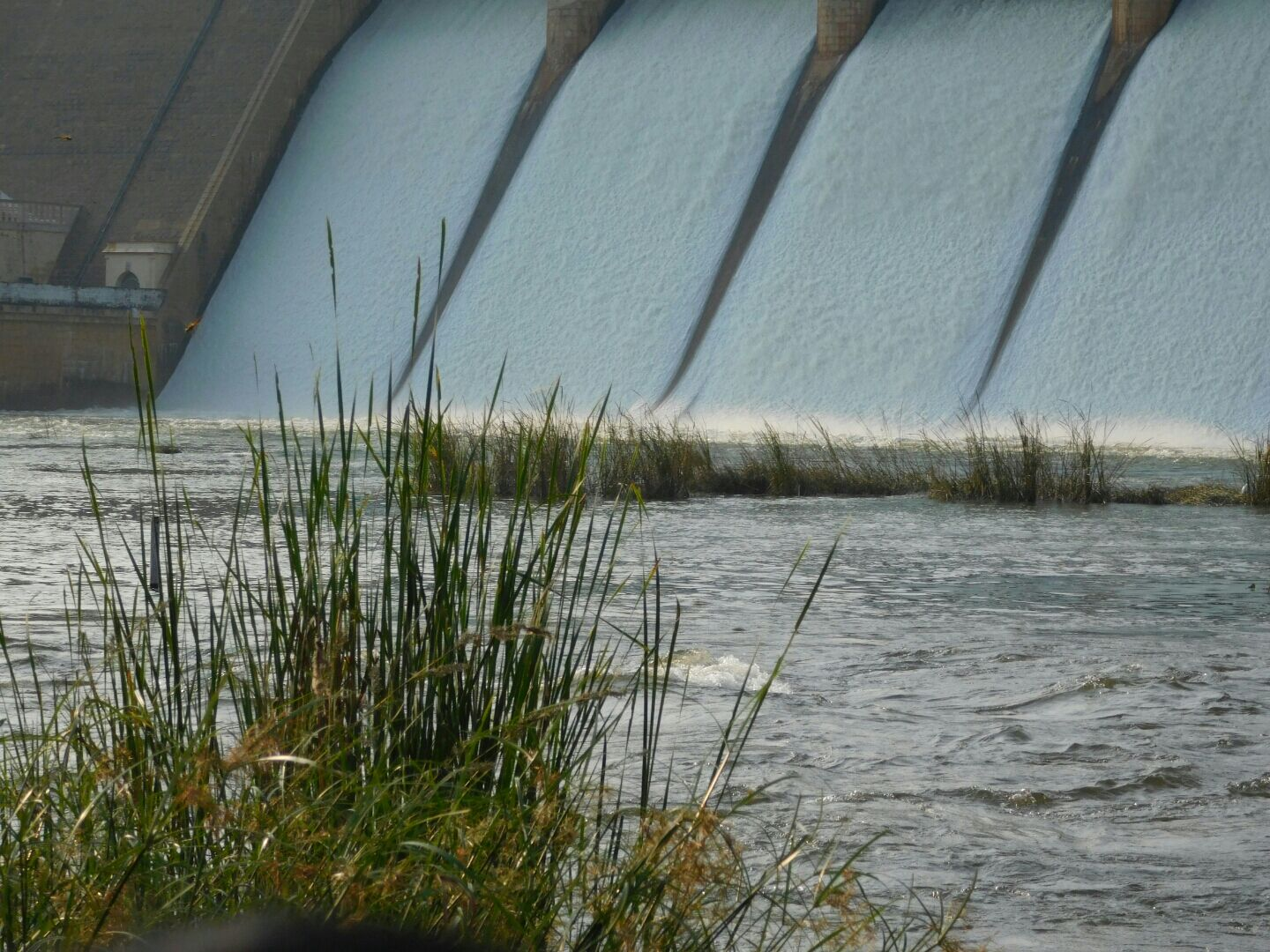
Vaigai dam sideview

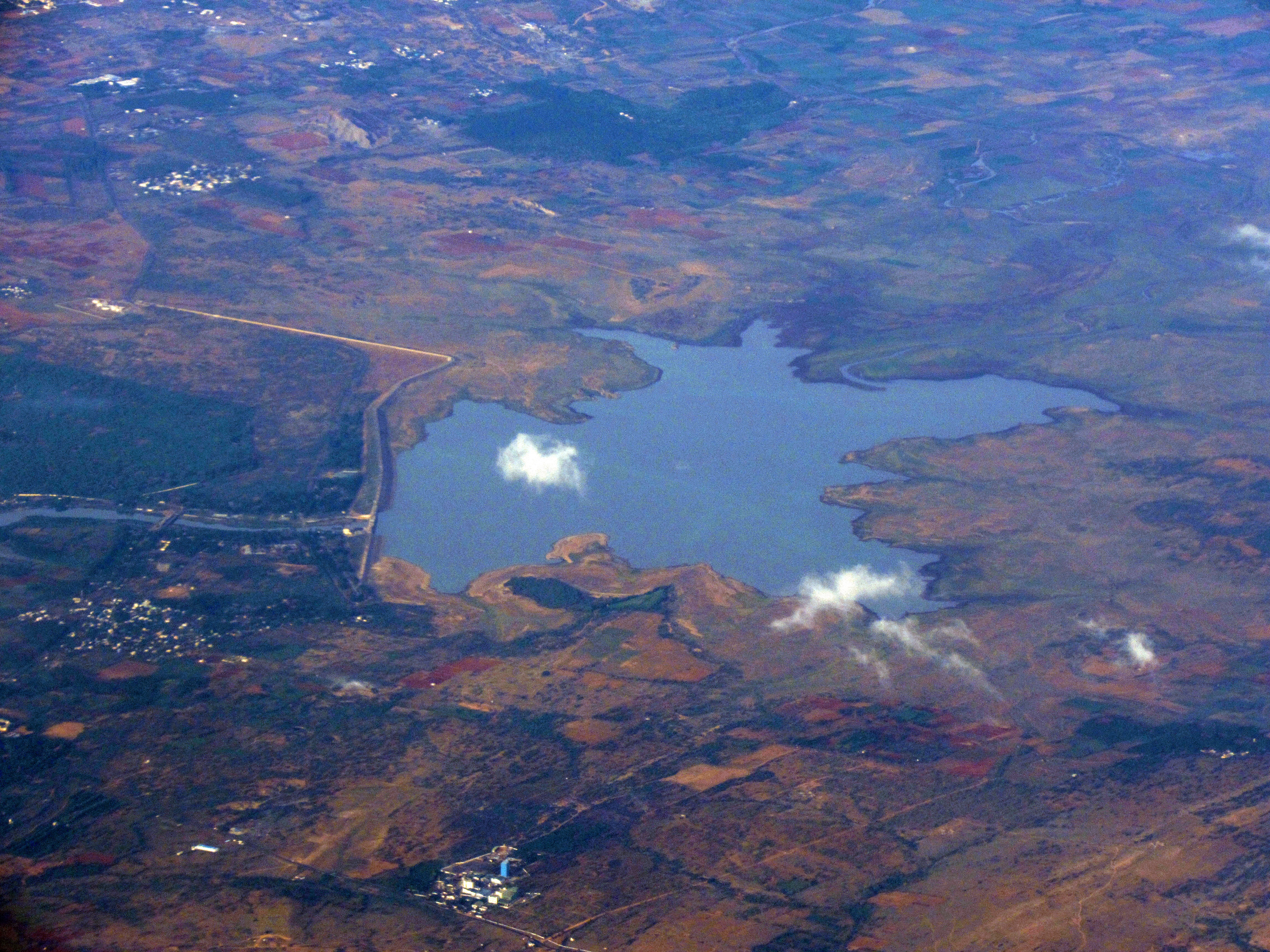
Aerial view
