= Kumbakkarai Falls =

Waterfall in Tamil Nadu, India

- Interactive map of Kumbakkarai Falls
- Location: Theni District
- Coordinates: 10°10′48″N 77°31′50″E
- Elevation: 400 meters (1,300 ft)
- Number of drops: 2
- Watercourse: Pambar River

Kumbakkarai Falls are lesser known falls in the foothills of the Kodaikanal Hills. They are located at 10°10′48″N 77°31′50″E in Theni district, 9 kilometers (5.6 mi) from Periyakulam. Kumbakkarai Falls are located along the Kodai-Vellagavi-Periyakulam footpath.

These falls have two stages. At the first stage, water collects in huge rock recesses which are each named after wild animals such as tiger, elephant, snake etc. The Pambar river then flows .5 km (0.31 mi) to the second stage before falling as the main waterfall.

The water originates in Kodaikanal Hills and flows along the rocks and finally reaches the foot hills. This place is called Kumbakarai. The travellers come here and take bath in the falls. The water flows throughout the year; but in rainy seasons the flow will be very heavy. Bathing is possible. There is a bus from Periyakulam with fare of Rs. 5 (6AM,7AM,1PM,3.30PM,4.30PM). There is no guest house.

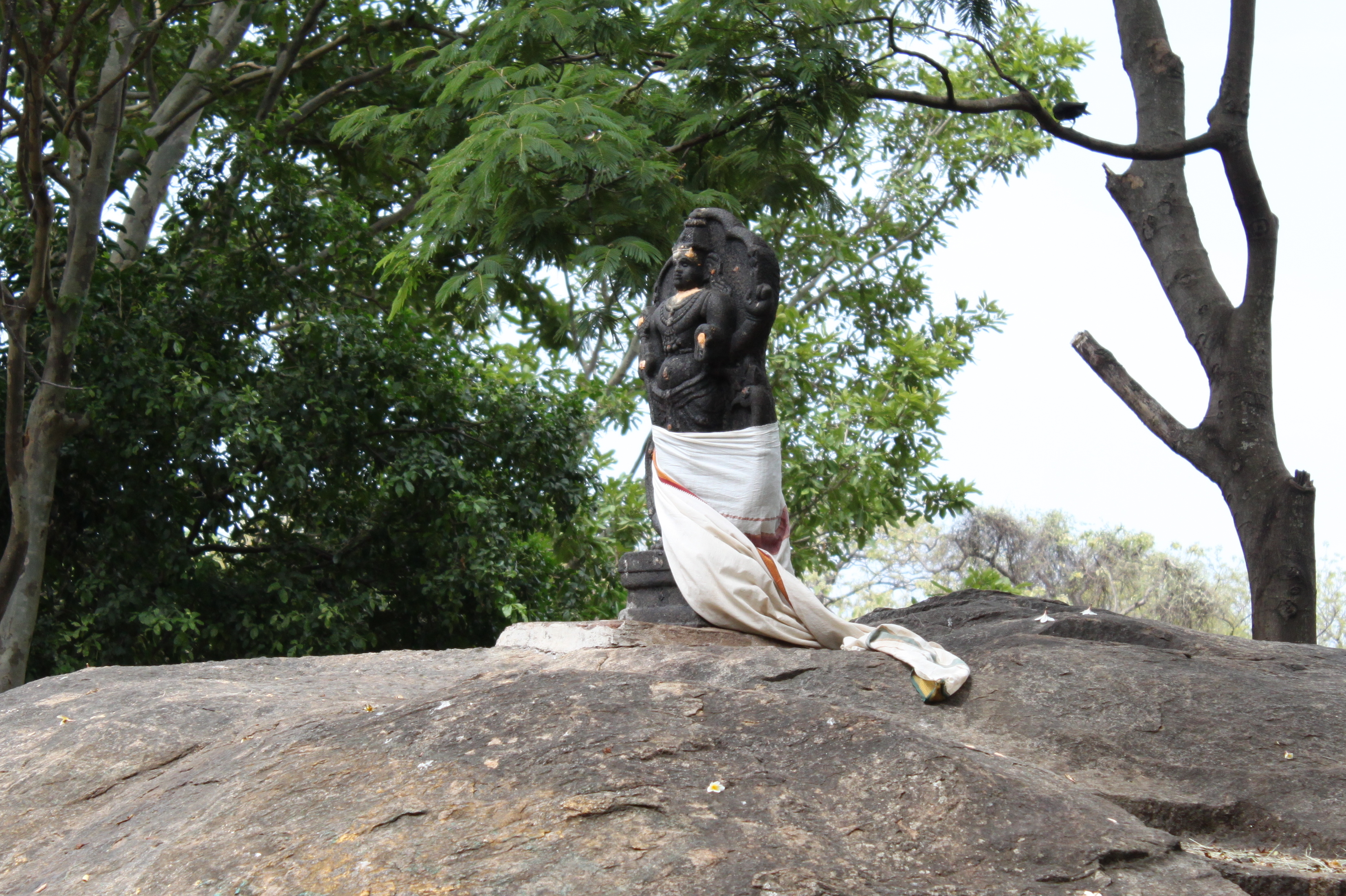
The Murugan Idol in Kumbakarai Falls

== History ==
The present day Kumbakarai which is tourist spot was once nothing but a forest with water falls. Thiru K.Chellam Iyer an affluent businessman of Periyakulam those days and Properiter of Bavani Krishna Vilas hotel wanted Kumbakarai Waterfalls to be one another tourist spot similar to courtallam. He obtained permission of the British government in 1942 and constructed dressing rooms, staircases and bathing spots in that area at his own expense and Kumbakarai water falls soon turned out to be a tourist spot. The present day Kumbakarai still speak of his name. The stone inscription at Kumbakarai waterfalls speaks about his contribution to the falls.

== See also ==
- List of waterfalls
- List of waterfalls in India
