= Marimuthu =

Marimuthu is an Indian name. Notable people with the name include:

== Given name ==
- Marimuthu Bharathan (born 1961), Indian human rights activist
- Marimuthu Muniandy (born 1971), Malaysian cricketer
- Marimuthu Palaniswami, Australian computer scientist
- M. Yoganathan (Marimuthu Yoganathan, born 1969), Indian environmental activist

== Surname ==
- A. Marimuthu (Aduthurai politician), INC, Tamil Nadu MLA for Aduthurai
- A. Marimuthu (Vanur MLA), DMK, Tamil Nadu MLA for Vanur
- A. R. Marimuthu, Indian politician
- Gomathi Marimuthu (born 1989), Indian track and field sprinter
- Moo. Marimuthu, Indian politician
- M. Marimuthu, Indian politician
- M. Marimuthu (Thanjavur MLA), Indian politician
- G. Marimuthu (1966–2023), Indian film director and actor
