= Periyakulam =

Periyakulam KuzhanthaimaaNagar
- Town
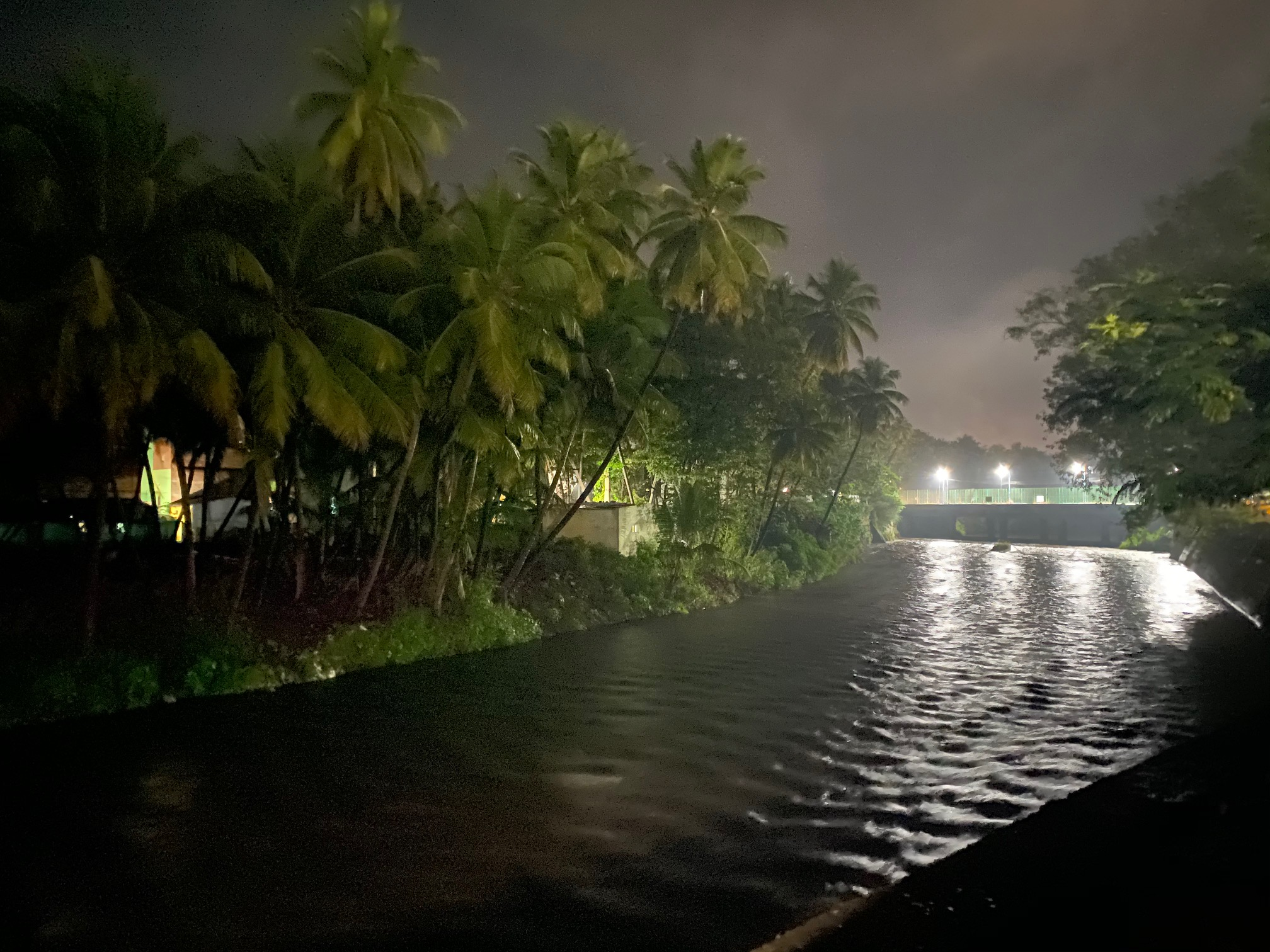
- Varaha Nathi, View from Thenkarai
- Nickname: Mango city
- Periyakulam, Tamil Nadu, India
- Coordinates: 10.1239°N 77.5475°E
- Country: India
- State: Tamil Nadu
- Zone: Madurai
- District: Theni

Government
  - Type: Second Grade Municipality
  - Body: Periyakulam Municipality

Area
  - Total: 12 km^{2} (4.6 sq mi)
- Elevation: 326 m (1,070 ft)

Population (2011)
  - Total: 42,976
  - Density: 56/km^{2} (150/sq mi)

Languages
  - Official: Tamil
- Time zone: UTC+5:30 (IST)
- PIN: 625601
- Telephone code: 04546
- Vehicle registration: TN-60
- Website: https://www.tnurbantree.tn.gov.in/periyakulam/

Periyakulam (Tamil: [peɾijagɯɭam]) is a major town in Theni district, in the Madurai Region, South Indian state of Tamil Nadu. As of 2011, the town had a population of 42,976. Periyakulam is the northern gateway of the district.

== Etymology ==
The name of this town derived from two Tamil words equivalent to "big lake" {in Tamil (Tamil: பெரிய) means "big" and (Tamil: குளம்) is "lake"}. In Tamil literature, the name of this town is Kulainthai Managaram (Tamil: குழந்தை மாநகரம்).

== History ==
There are three very old temples. The Balasubramaniam Swamy temple is located on the banks of the Varaha nadhi (Varaha river). Periyakovil Temple and Karanamoorthy Swamy temple are located on the Periyakulam pond. On the southeast side Kailasanathar temple located in the hills.

== Geography ==
Periyakulam is a city situated on the palm fringed banks of the Varaganathi, a perennial river with the great wall of the Kodaikanal hills. Periyakulam (PKM) is located at 10.07°N 77.33°E. It has an average elevation of 282 metres (925 feet). It is located at the foothills of the Western Ghats bordering the neighbouring state of Kerala. It is one of the most fertile places in the state of Tamil Nadu. Agriculture is the primary occupation for the population here. It is also known as the "Mango City", as a major supply of mangoes from this city goes into Tamil Nadu's mango output. It stands on the bank of the 'Varaha' (in Hindu mythology, Lord Maha Vishnu's Boar incarnation) river. It is a fertile area that has an annual supply of surplus rainfall. Periyakulam riverine wetland is situated in Udayar pallam, Kanyakumari District, Tamil Nadu. The average rainfall of that area is 145 cm. The water of the wetland is mainly used for drinking and irrigation purposes. The villages that are included are Keelavadakarai, Kailasapatti, T. Kallipatti, Thamarai kulam, Vadugapatti, Melmangalam and Jeyamangalam villages that also stand on the banks of the Varaha River. The original town was near New ground but later shifted due to plague scare.

=== Topography ===
Periyakulam City has an area of 21 km^{2}, within an urban area now extending over as much as 55 km^{2} and it is located at 10.07°N 77.33°E. It has an average elevation of 356 m above mean sea level.

=== Climate ===
The climate is salubrious, with northeast monsoon rains during October–December. Temperatures during summer reach a maximum of 40 °C and a minimum of 26.3 °C, though temperatures over 43 °C are not uncommon. Winter temperatures range between 29.6 °C and 18 °C. The average annual rainfall is about 105 cm. The lowest temperature reached in 2019 was 14.1 °C.

== Demographics ==
=== Population ===
According to 2011 census, Periyakulam had a population of 42,976 with a sex-ratio of 1,013 females for every 1,000 males, much above the national average of 929. A total of 4,095 were under the age of six, constituting 2,081 males and 2,014 females. Scheduled Castes and Scheduled Tribes accounted for 15.02% and 0.01% of the population respectively. The average literacy of the town was 79.84%, compared to the national average of 72.99%. The town had a total of 11,401 households. There were a total of 14,857 workers, comprising 523 cultivators, 3,051 main agricultural labourers, 272 in house hold industries, 9,492 other workers, 1,519 marginal workers, 25 marginal cultivators, 809 marginal agricultural labourers, 60 marginal workers in household industries and 625 other marginal workers.

The population has been declining since the 1990s. According to World Gazetteer the population as of 2012 is only 39,185 down from 46,744 in 1991 which would mean that Periyakulam has only 8,000 people more than it did in 1951. This would make it one of the few cities in India to have a marginal population increase since 1951.

=== Languages ===
Tamil is spoken predominantly in and around Periyakulam. Madurai Tamil is the standard dialect spoken.

== Government and politics ==
Periyakulam was formerly represented by the Periyakulam Lok Sabha constituency. Following the delimitation of parliamentary constituencies, the former constituency was replaced by the Theni Lok Sabha constituency, of which the Periyakulam Assembly constituency forms a part.

Former Chief Minister of Tamil Nadu O. Panneerselvam represented the Periyakulam Assembly constituency after being elected from the constituency in the 2001 and 2006 elections. He later represented the Bodinayakanur Assembly constituency.

In the 2026 Tamil Nadu Legislative Assembly election, G. Sabari Iyngaran of the Tamilaga Vettri Kazhagam was elected from the Periyakulam Assembly constituency.

Periyakulam is part of the Theni Lok Sabha constituency. In the 2024 Indian general election, Thanga Tamilselvan of the Dravida Munnetra Kazhagam was elected as the Member of Parliament from Theni.

== Culture/Cityscape ==
Periyakulam is also known as ‘Mango City’ and is known for its sweet Mangoes. Periyakulam is also known for its sweet water which comes from the Berijam Lake kodaikanal. It has nice weather throughout the year.

Periyakulam is an undesigned river-based settlement city which located "Theni district" in India. The city has been divided into two major divisions by the river: Thenkarai (southern part) and Vadakarai (northern part). The streets around the city are based upon communal settlements symbolizing the structure of the cosmos. It owns rich resources with bunch of historical relics such as "archaeological vestiges, inscriptions and ancient temples". It is also regarded as a "holy space" that catches people's attention.

=== Tourist attractions ===
Periyakulam itself has an abundance of tourist places; also around Periyakulam, you can find a number of tourist locations. To name a few, Sothuparai Dam (9 km), Kumbakarai Falls (8 km), Theertha Thotti (2 km), Vaigai Dam (15 km), Manjalar Dam (18 km), Kodaikanal (49 km via Kumbakarai, Adukkam) (72 km via devathanapatty) Thekkady (80 km), Surulithirtham (60 km), Munnar (103 km) and many more. MaruthaNayagam Masjid located in Vadagarai (legs of Marutha Nayagam were buried in this Masjid).

The Kumbakkarai Waterfalls are located 8 km away from Periyakulam. These waterfalls used to be quite dangerous, with lot of pits. Hence people were afraid to go near them. In 1942, an affluent business person, Thiru K Chellam Iyer, proprietor of Bavani Krishna Vilas Hotel - Periyakulam, dredged the entire falls area, closed the dangerous holes, constructed dressing rooms, and built staircases for safe access to the falls. With his efforts the falls developed into a tourist spot.

== Education ==
The school at Periyakulam is Victoria Memorial High School which caters to education in the town.

The Horticultural College & Research Institute (HC & RI), one of the constituency colleges of Tamil Nadu Agricultural University, is located at Periyakulam. Government Nursing college is located at Periyakulam.

=== Colleges ===
- Jayaraj Annapakiyan College of arts and Science, Tamarikulam post, government
- Government college of Horticulture
- VPV college of engineering, D. Vadipatti post
- Mary Matha college of arts and Science
- Government College of Nursing, Theni district head govt hospital
- Devangar Polytechnic College
- Thanga muthu Polytechnic College
- Thiraviyam group of institutions

== Notable people ==
- Bala, film director; National Film Award for best direction
- Mu. Metha, Tamil poet
- O. Panneerselvam, Former Chief Minister of Tamil Nadu
- Singampuli, film actor
- Major Sundarrajan, film actor
- Vairamuthu, Indian lyricist and poet
