= Andipatti =

Andipatti Aandipatti
- Neighbourhood
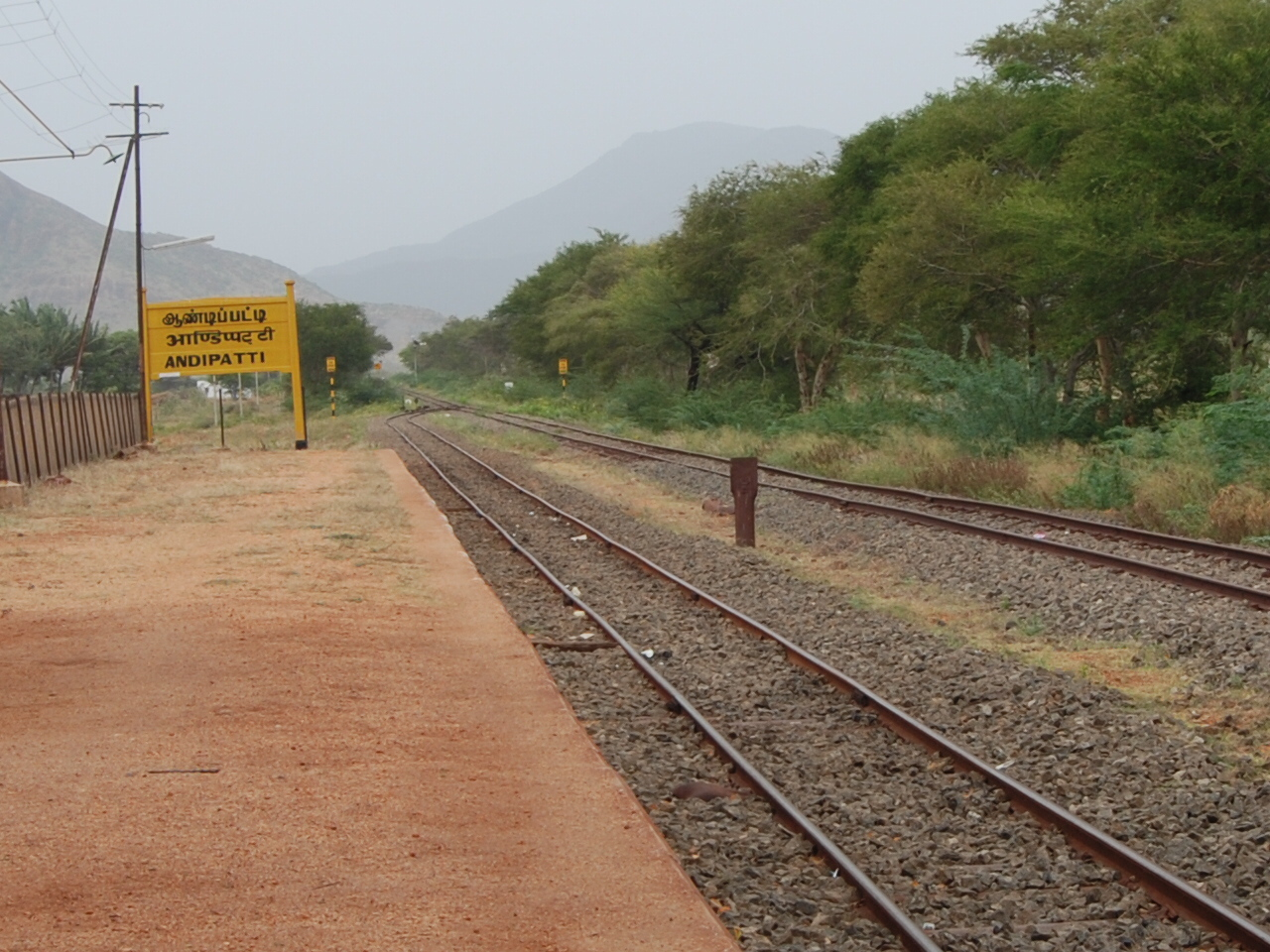
- Andipatti Railway Station

- Andipatti, Tamil Nadu, India
- Coordinates: 10.0015°N 77.6164°E
- Country: India
- State: Tamil Nadu
- Region: Madurai
- District: Theni
- Elevation: 334 m (1,096 ft)

Languages
  - Official: Tamil
- Time zone: UTC+5:30 (IST)

Andipatti or Aundipatty is a municipal body in the Theni district in of Tamil Nadu state in southern India. It is on the bank of Vaigai River with rich flora and fauna species. It is a valley surrounded by mountains and there is a theory saying Western Ghats starts from this place.

Agriculture is the main economic activity of the town with handloom and textile mills spread across the city limits. Nearby places include Theni, Madurai, Cumbum, Nadukkottai and Gudalur. The town is known all over the state and country as having been the constituency of the two chief ministers: M. G. Ramachandran and J. Jayalalithaa.

The Vaigai Dam, a major reservoir in Tamil Nadu, is 7 km away from Andipatti, Theni district, Madurai Region.

== History ==
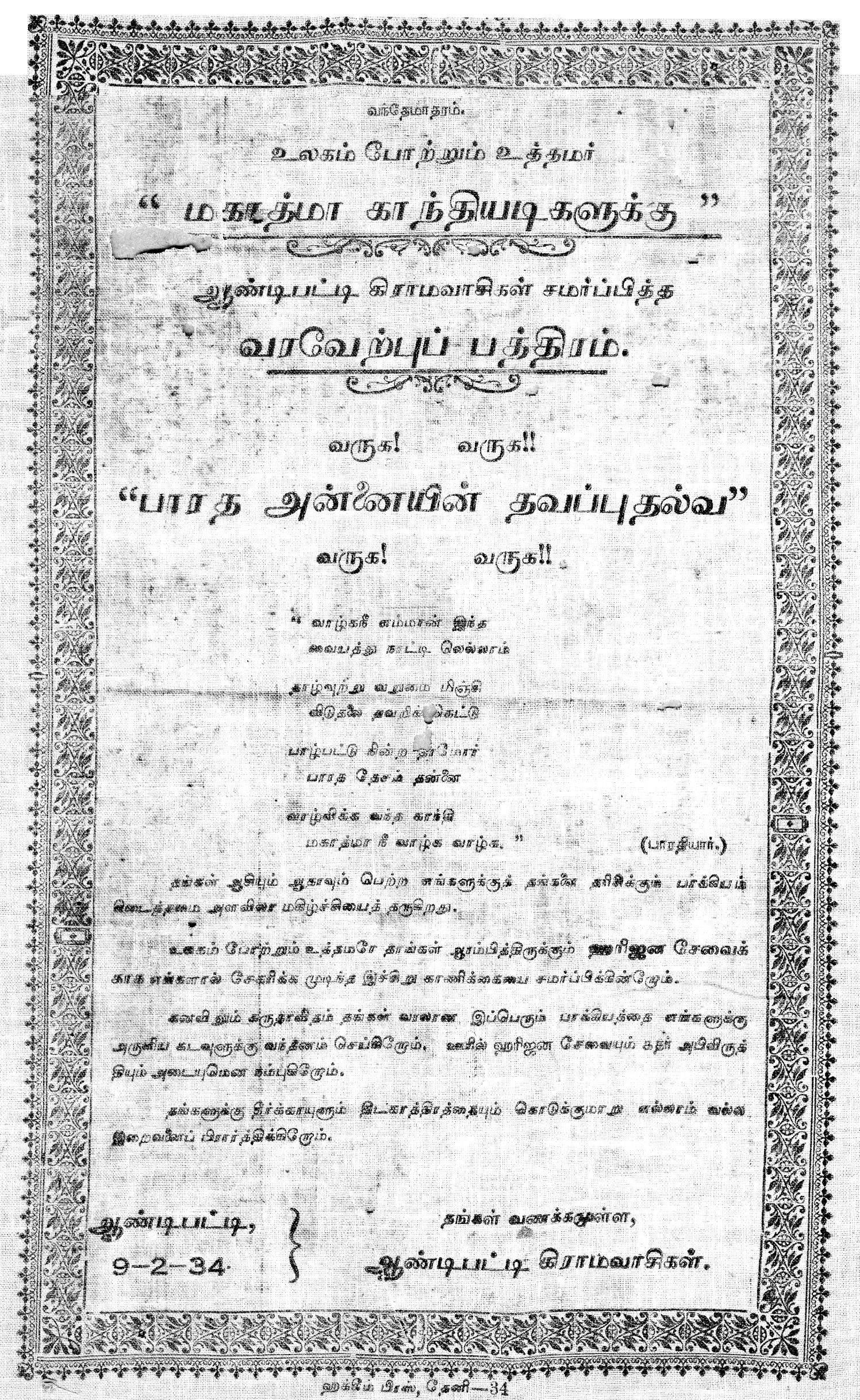
Welcome Address presented to Mahatma Gandhi by the Andipatti villagers

On 9 February 1934, Mahatma Gandhi visited Andipatti, arriving by train at 5:30 PM from Theni. At the Andipatti Railway Station, the villagers of Andipatti received him, along with a large crowd from the neighbouring villages like Muthukrishnapuram, S.S.Puram, Lakshmipuram, Jakkampatti. A wooden table was placed on the platform of the Andipatti Station and Gandhi used it as a dais to address the gathering; a Welcome Address in Tamil printed on khadi cloth and wooden-framed was read out by Mr. P.C. Rajan and handed over to Gandhi, who was delighted to see it printed on his favourite khadi cloth. He wished to carry it with him on his tour, but realised that he could not carry it all through his journey. Hence with the permission of the villagers, he decided to auction the memento and use the fund for welfare scheme. P.C. Rajan was the successful bidder and he collected the souvenir from the hands of Gandhi. The piece was later on donated by Mr. Rajan to the authorities of the Gandhi Museum in Madurai in the 1960s.

== Politics ==
Andipatti (State Assembly Constituency) is a part of Theni (Lok Sabha constituency).

== Education ==
- Bharath Niketan College of Engineering, in Thimmarasanayakanoor is an educational institution in Andipatti.
