= Uthamapalayam =

Uthampalaiyam
- Town
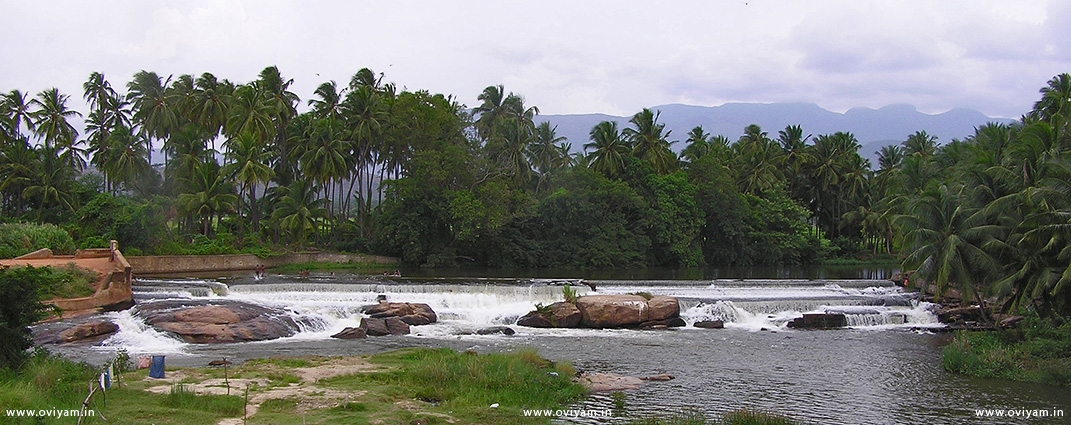
- Mullaiperiyar River

- Location in Tamil Nadu Location in India
- Coordinates: 9.8°N 77.3333°E
- Country: India
- State: Tamil Nadu
- District: Theni
- Zone: Madurai
- Elevation: 384 m (1,260 ft)

Population (2011)
  - Total: 29,050

Languages
  - Official: Tamil
- Time zone: UTC+5:30 (IST)
- PIN: 625533
- Telephone code: +91 4554
- Vehicle registration: TN 60 Z
- Distance from Chennai: 537 kilometres (334 mi) southwest
- Distance from Madurai: 106 kilometres (66 mi) southwest
- Website: uthamapalayam.upm@facebook.com

Uthamapalayam is a town in Theni district in the Indian state of Tamil Nadu. Uthamapalayam, a beautiful town in today's Theni district, has witnessed the influence of various rulers throughout history. In ancient times, it was under the Pandya dynasty. Later, it became an important region during the rule of the Madurai Nayaks. After the decline of the Nayaks, the area was governed by local chieftains known as Poligars (Palaiyakkara).

After the Polygar Wars (1799–1805), the British took over this region. Subsequently, Uthamapalayam became part of Madurai District under the Madras Presidency. In the late 19th century, the commencement of the Mullaiperiyar Dam project (1886) brought significant agricultural development to Uthamapalayam and the Cumbum Valley.

Today, Uthamapalayam stands proud with its historical legacy, advancing in education, agriculture, and cultural growth. Mullaiperiyar river is one of the attraction for this town.

== Haji Karutha Rowther ==
Hajee Karutha Rowther, born in 1888 in Uthamapalayam (present-day Theni district, Tamil Nadu), belonged to an agricultural family. His real name was S. Mohamed Meeran Rowther, and he earned the nickname "Karutha Rowther" due to his dark complexion. Despite limited formal education, he strongly believed in the transformative power of education.

Known as the "Father of Education in Theni District", he dedicated his life to uplifting rural students. In 1956, he founded Hajee Karutha Rowther Howdia College, the first rural college in the then Madurai district, donating 58.81 acres of land and ₹2 lakh for its establishment. The college was inaugurated by Chief Minister K. Kamaraj. He also started a Residential Madrasa (1914) and a Primary School, offering free education and boarding for poor students. His contributions extended to other institutions like Jamal Mohamed College (Trichy) and The New College (Chennai).

Role in Freedom Struggle and Social Work:

Hajee Karutha Rowther actively participated in the Indian Freedom Movement, including the Khilafat Movement and Non-Cooperation Movement. He promoted Khadi, opened a Khadi shop in Uthamapalayam, and worked alongside leaders like E.V. Ramasamy Periyar. He also funded to construct at Uthamapalayam Government Hospital in 1954 and supported communal harmony.

== Samanar Kovil near Uthamapalayam – Traces of History ==
Uthamapalayam and its surrounding areas stand as a testimony to the ancient Jain traditions of Tamil Nadu. The word "Samanar" refers to the Jain faith (derived from the Sanskrit word Śramaṇa, meaning ascetic). In this region, caves, rock carvings, and inscriptions dating back over 2,000 years can still be found, where Jain monks once lived.

== Temple ==
Shri Kalatheeswarar Temple, 500 years old, is a Sivan Temple located in Uthamapalayam, Theni District. Located 29 km from the Theni. This temple is named "THEN KALAKASTHI" (South Kalakasthi). Kalatheeswarar Temple placing statues of the other god in identical roles as the Temple of Kalakasthi, Andhra Pradesh. East facing Kannappar Shrine, Grahas Raghu & Kedhu also has an individual shrines there. Every Sunday Pooja darshan for Moolavar (Lord Sivan) happens at Raghu time.

=== Shri Yoga Narasimha Perumal Temple ===
Shri Narasingam Yoga Narasimha Perumal Temple, 50 years old, is a Vishnu Temple located in Uthamapalayam.

=== Shri Muthu Karuppana Swami Kovil ===
Shri Muthu Karuppana Swami Kovil, is located in Uthamapalayam. It is Locally named for the Karuppa Samy Temple at the foot of the Tirukunnagiri hills.

== Demographics ==
Religious census
Religion	Percent(%)
Hindu	50.49%
Muslim	30.99%
Christian	17.79%
Other	0.04%
No religion	0.68%

As of 2011 India census, Uthamapalayam had a population of 29,050. 10% of the population is under 6 years of age. Uthamapalayam has an average literacy rate of 73%, higher than the national average of 59.5%: The literacy rate of male and female is 80 and 66% respectively. Uthamapalayam is the headquarters of Uthamapalayam Taluk and Uthamapalayam Panchayat Union.

== Government ==
Subordinate judge court along with one judicial magistrate court, one judicial magistrate fast track court and one district munsif court.

== Climate ==
Southwest Monsoon and Northeast Monsoon contributes to the rainfall significantly. Being part of Theni it is one of the lush places in Tamil Nadu with high rainfall in most months. The place has a tropical climate with warm weather throughout the year.

Climate data for Uthamapalayam, Tamil Nadu
Month	Jan	Feb	Mar	Apr	May	Jun	Jul	Aug	Sep	Oct	Nov	Dec	Year
Mean daily maximum °C (°F)	29.1 (84.4)	30.7 (87.3)	32.5 (90.5)	32.8 (91.0)	32.7 (90.9)	31.0 (87.8)	29.9 (85.8)	30.1 (86.2)	30.4 (86.7)	29.6 (85.3)	28.5 (83.3)	28.4 (83.1)	30.5 (86.9)
Mean daily minimum °C (°F)	19.7 (67.5)	20.5 (68.9)	22.1 (71.8)	23.3 (73.9)	23.8 (74.8)	23.2 (73.8)	22.6 (72.7)	22.5 (72.5)	22.3 (72.1)	22.0 (71.6)	21.3 (70.3)	20.1 (68.2)	22.0 (71.5)
Average precipitation mm (inches)	22 (0.9)	30 (1.2)	55 (2.2)	108 (4.3)	113 (4.4)	139 (5.5)	181 (7.1)	123 (4.8)	117 (4.6)	241 (9.5)	175 (6.9)	71 (2.8)	1,375 (54.2)
Source: Climate-Data.org

== Education ==
Government Higher Secondary School and Mohamed Fathima Girls' High School are very famous in this taluk. A government aided arts and sciences college named Hajee Karutha Rowther Howdia College is serving over fifty years. This is the first college in this part of the state after independence.

== Adjacent communities ==
The town is surrounded with small villages to moderate towns like Kombai, Chinamanur, Cumbam, Royapanpatti, Kurumbapatti (Ambasamuthram), Ammapatti, Ellapatti, Thevaram, and Bodi.
