= Theni district =

- District of Tamil Nadu
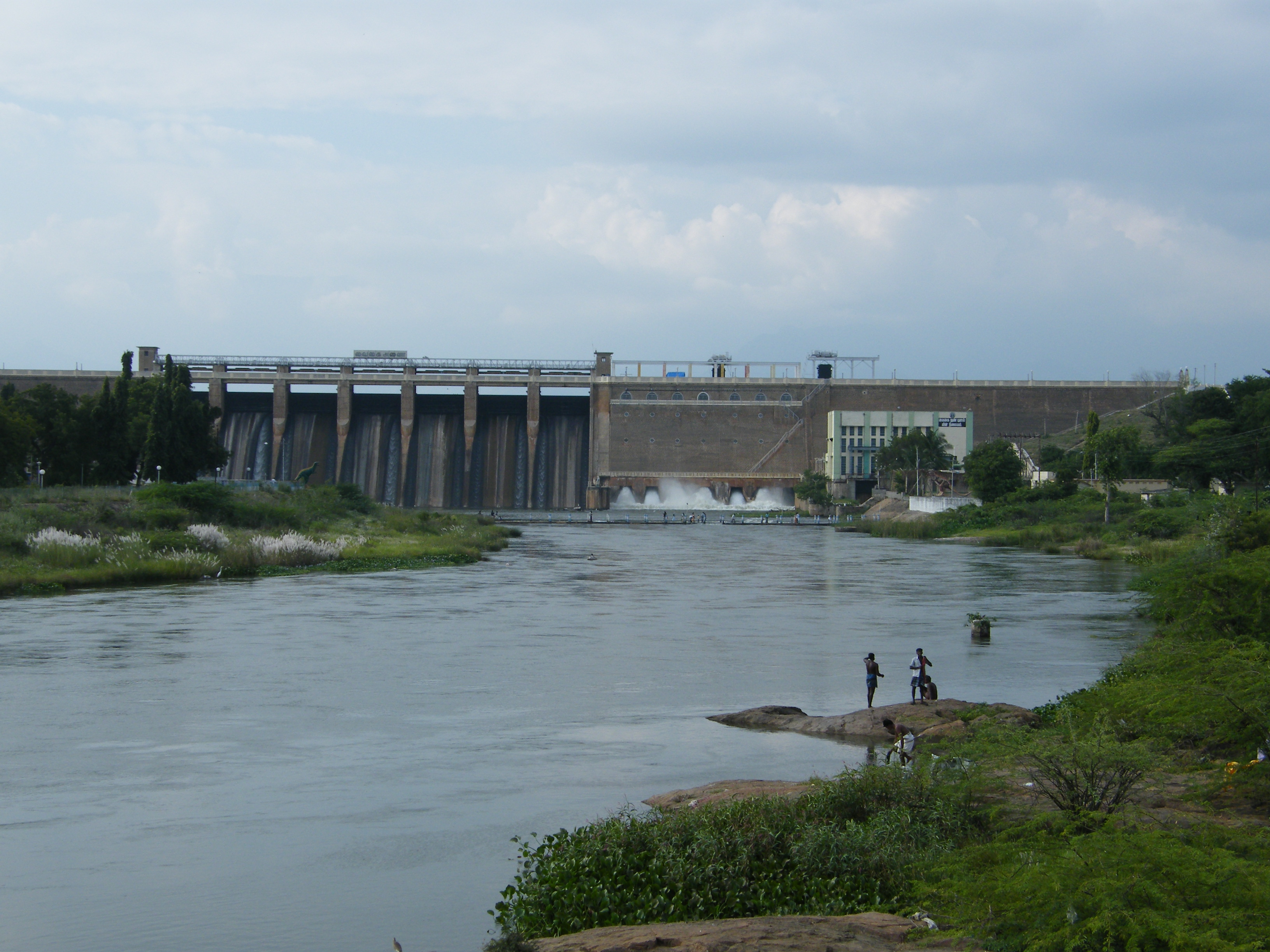
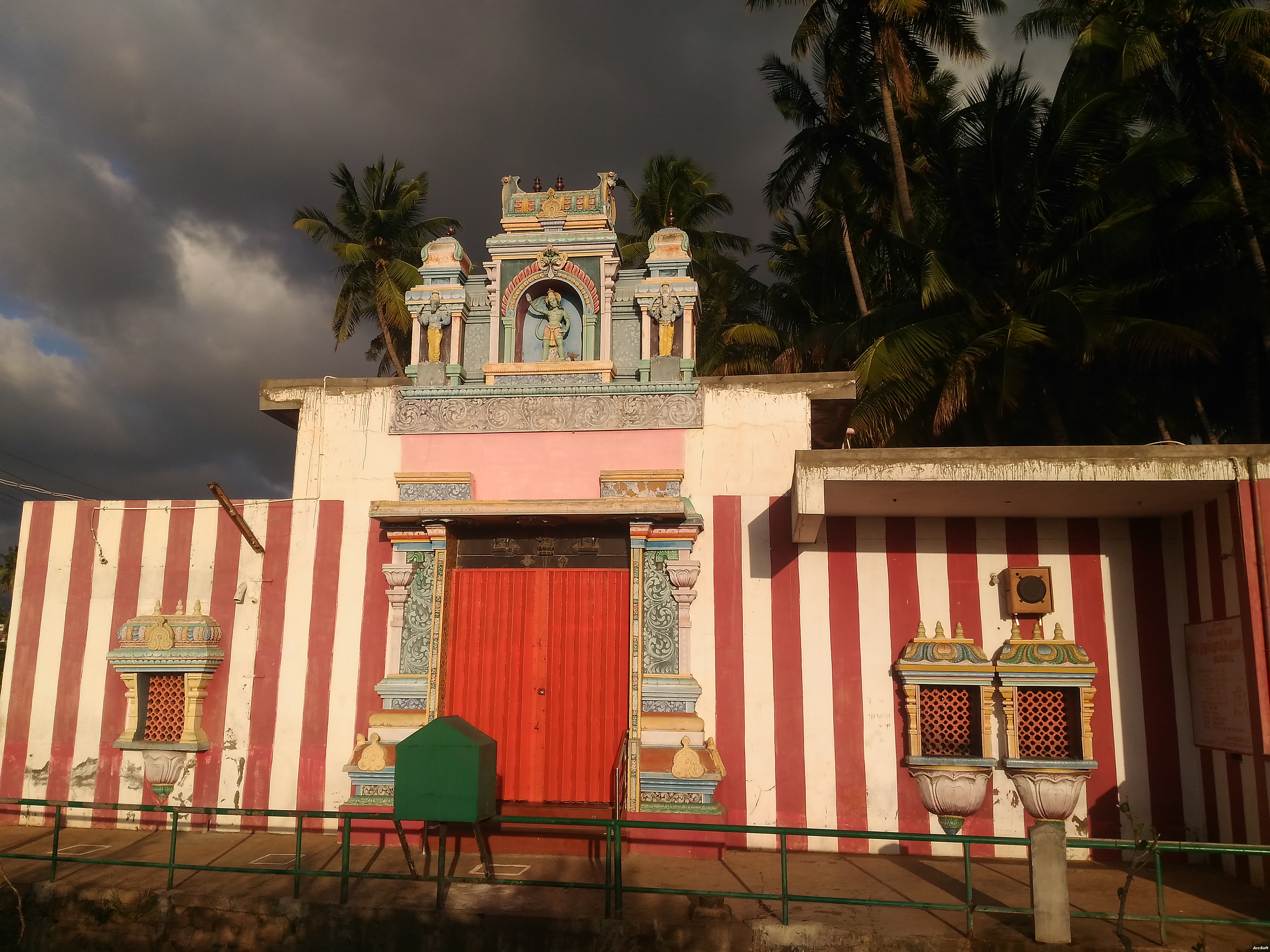
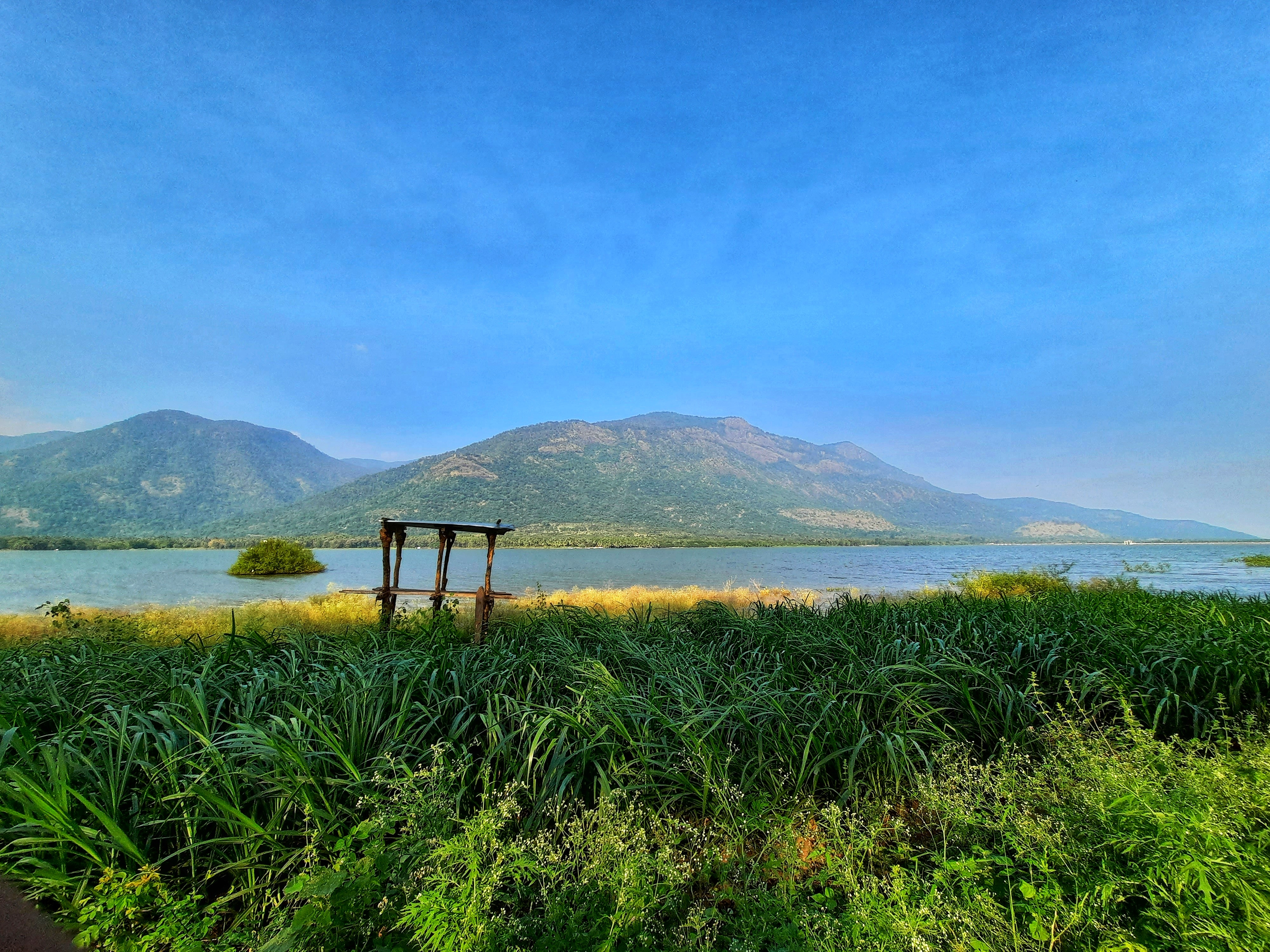
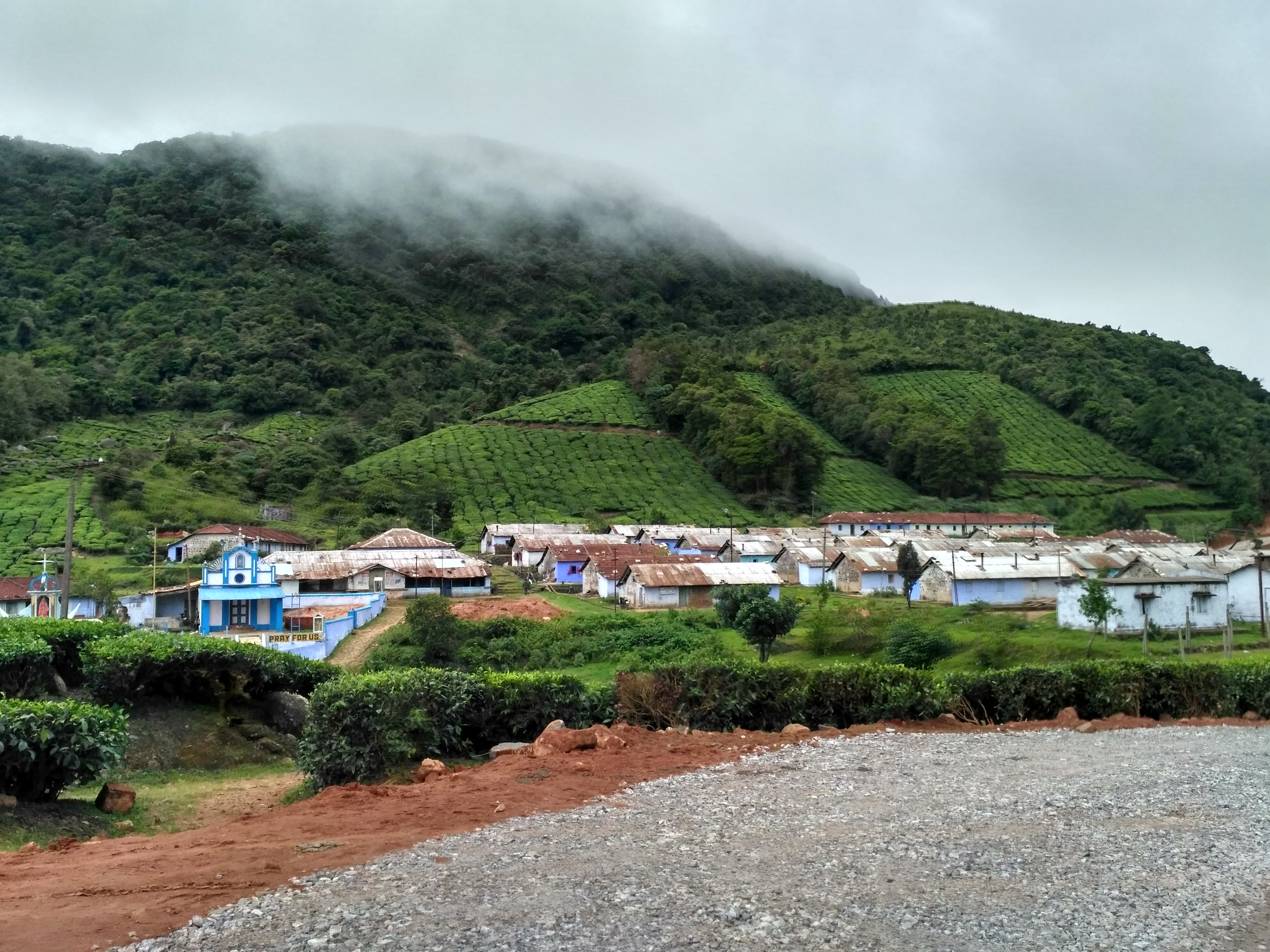
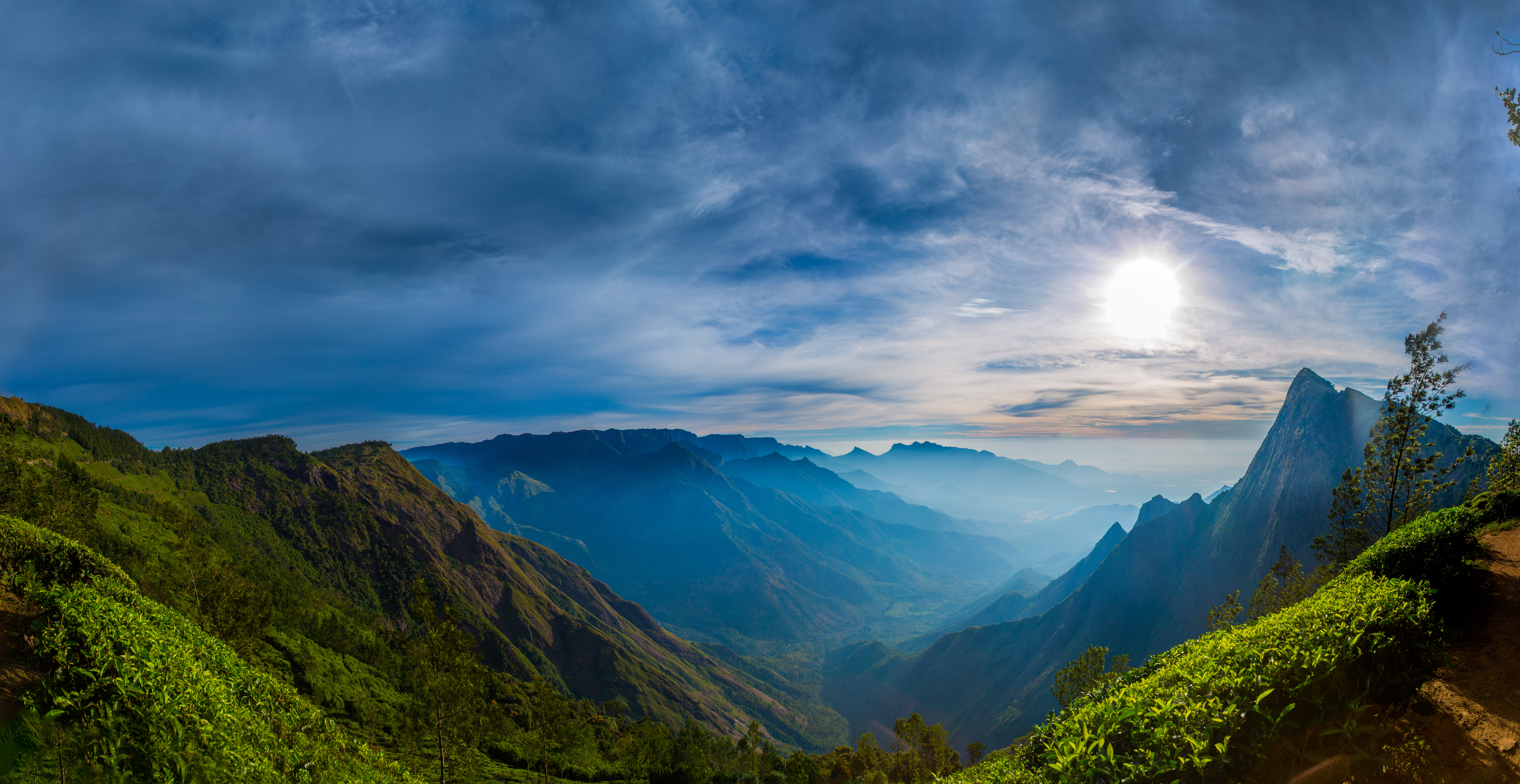
- Clockwise from top-left: Vaigai Dam, Anumandharaayapperumaal temple, Meghamalai, view of Theni Valley from Kolukkumalai, Manjalar Dam

- Location in Tamil Nadu
- Theni district
- Coordinates: 9.9330° N, 77.4702° E
- Country: India
- State: Tamil Nadu
- Established: 7 July 1997
- Headquarters: Theni
- Talukas: Andipatti, Bodinayakanur, Periyakulam, Theni, Uthamapalayam

Government
  - District Collector: Ranjeet Singh Indian Administrative Service took charge on 13.02.2025 IAS

Area
  - District of Tamil Nadu: 2,868 km^{2} (1,107 sq mi)
  - Rank: 3007

Population (2011)
  - District of Tamil Nadu: 1,245,899
  - Density: 434.4/km^{2} (1,125/sq mi)
  - Metro: 591,841
- Time zone: UTC+5:30 (IST)
- PIN: 625531
- Telephone code: 04546
- ISO 3166 code: ISO 3166-2:IN
- Vehicle registration: TN-60 (Theni), TN-60Z (Uttamapalayam)
- Coastline: 0 kilometres (0 mi)
- Largest city: Theni
- Sex ratio: M-50.5%/F-49.5% ♂/♀
- Literacy: 71.58%
- Legislature type: elected
- Legislature Strength: 5
- Precipitation: 833.5 millimetres (32.81 in)
- Avg. summer temperature: 40.5 °C (104.9 °F)
- Avg. winter temperature: 15 °C (59 °F)
- Website: www.theni.nic.in; www.theni.org

Theni district is one of the 38 districts of Tamil Nadu state in India. Surrounded by hills, the district is located to the west of Madurai district. The town of Theni is the district headquarters. The district is divided into two natural divisions by the hills and is further subdivided into five Taluks: Theni, Bodinayakanur, Periyakulam, Uthamapalayam and Andipatti. The area is rich in natural features, with thick vegetation and perennial streams from the hills on the western side, and Cumbum Valley, which lies in Uthamapalayam taluk. As of 2011, Theni district had a population of 1,245,899.

== History ==
Theni District was formed by the splitting from the former Madurai District as per G.O. Ms. No. 679 Revenue Department, dated 7 July 1996. Because of the bifurcation, a new Revenue Division (Uthamapalayam) and two new taluks—Theni and Bodinayakanur—were created on 1 January 1997. Theni Municipal town was not a district headquarters until this date.

The region covered by present-day Theni District was sparsely populated before the 1900s. In 1886 Mullaperiyar Dam project bought part of the water from Periyar River downhill to the Cumbum Valley and merged it into the Mullayar River. This project lead more people to settle down in Cumbum Valley.

Theni was a small, lesser-known town through the 1900s. After the Mullai-Periyar merger project, many people from nearby arid regions (Sivakasi, Kovilpatti, Virudhunagar, Sattur, and others) settled in the present day Theni District, leading to an influx of people from the 1890s to 1920s. Later, the area developed rapidly due to commerce.

== Geography ==
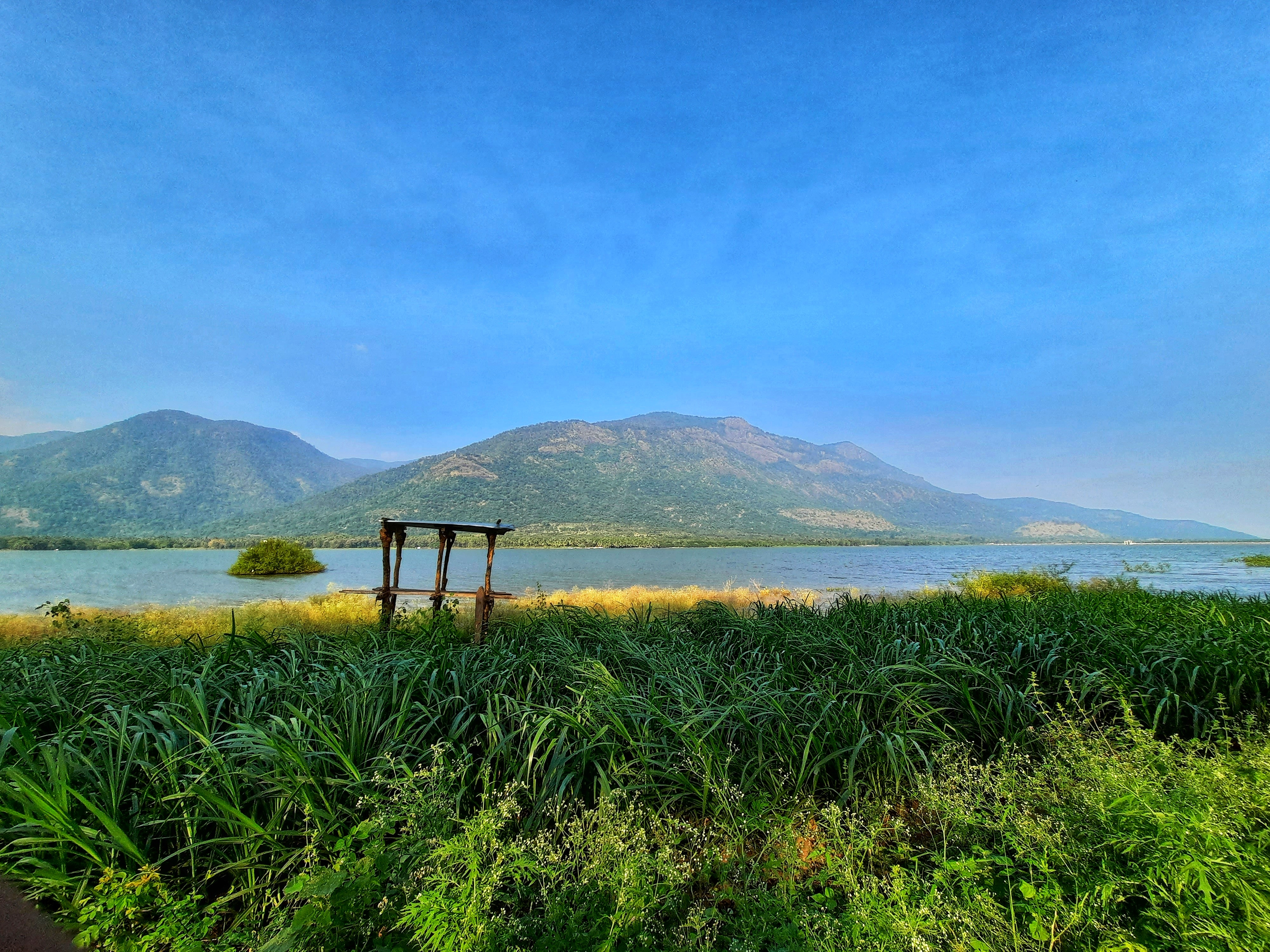
Manjalar Dam

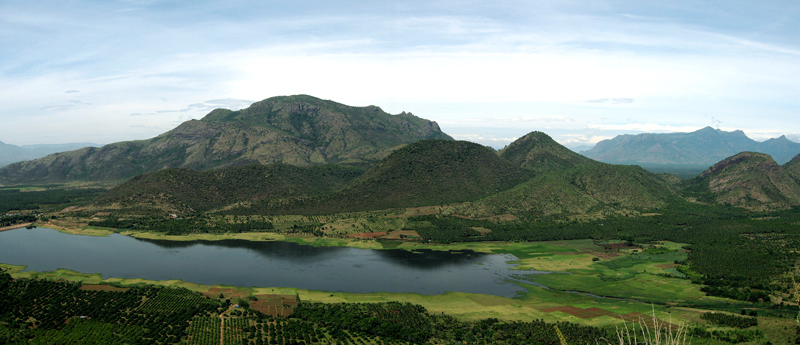
Manjalaru Dam.

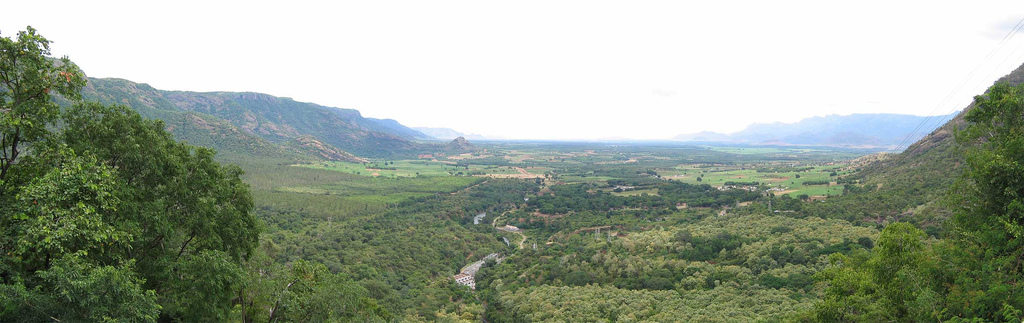
Cumbum Valley.

The 2,889 km^{2} (1,115 sq mi) district lies at the foot of the Western Ghats between 9' 39' and 10' 30' North latitude and between 77' 00' and 78' 30' of East Longitude. Central location: 10°04′N 77°45′E. The district is bordered by Dindigul District to the north, Madurai District to the east, Virudhunagar District to the southwest, and Idukki district of the state of Kerala to the west.

A range of hills which runs parallel to Western Ghats from north to south separates it from the neighboring state of Kerala.

=== Climate ===
In the plains, the temperatures range from a minimum of 15 °C (59 °F) to a maximum of 40 °C (104 °F). In the hills, the temperatures can range from as low as 4–5 °C (39–41 °F) to 25 °C (77 °F). The district is known for its pleasant climate, hills, and lakes.

=== Rivers and dams ===
The Vaigai River, Kottagudi River, Varaganathi River, Shanmuganathi River and Manjalar River flow through the district. The main reservoirs in the district are Lower Periyar Dam, Vaigai Dam, Shanmuganathi Dam and Sothuparai Dam.

== Economy ==
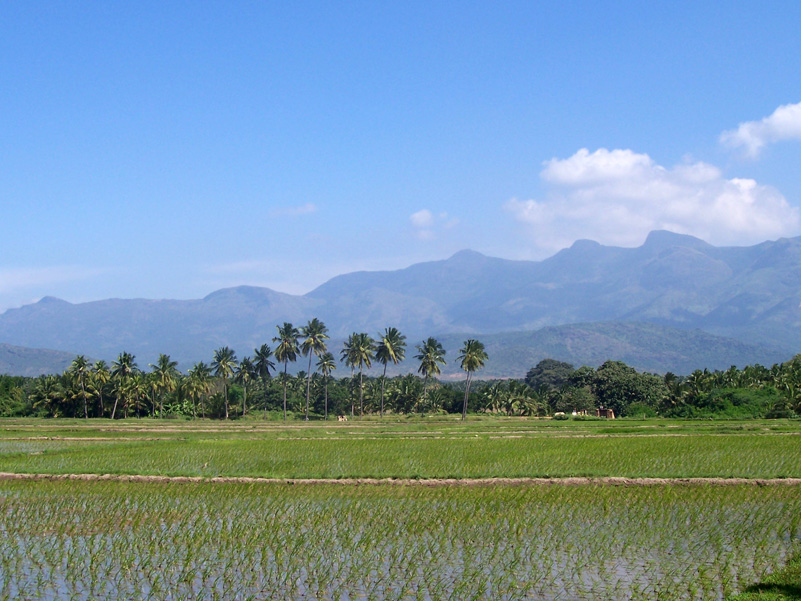
Paddy fields across the backdrop of the Western Ghats

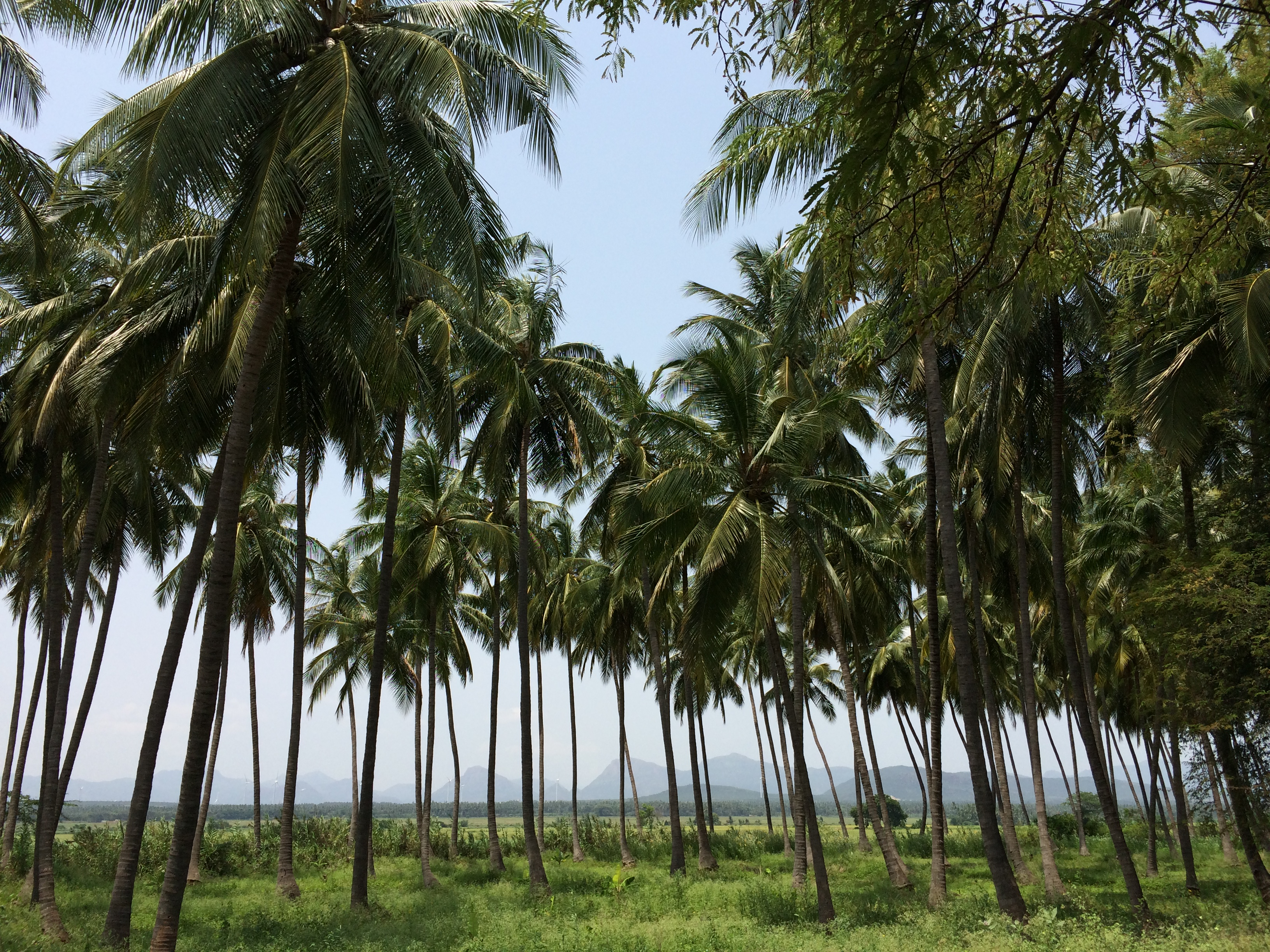
Coconut groves in Theni District

The economy of Theni district is mostly agricultural. Utilization of land area for cultivation in the district is 40.33%. The principal crops produced (in tonnes) in 2005-2006 were sugarcane 1,201,221, cotton 95,360 (561 bales of 170. kg lint each), rice (paddy) 66,093, millets and other cereals 57,081, pulses 6,677, groundnut 4,021 and gingelly 325. Silk, Banana, Coconut, Tea, Coffee, Cardamom, Grapes and Mangoes are the other main produce of the district. Kolukkumalai located in Theni district atop the Western Ghats is the home to the highest-altitude tea plantation in the world. Cumbum Valley is a major centre for grape production with 4,000 small farmers producing over 90,000 tonnes of Muscat grapes, locally known as panneer dhrakshai, and about 10,000 tonnes of Thomson seedless grapes. The unique feature here is that the grapes are harvested throughout the year, while in most grape growing centres elsewhere the season ends with summer.

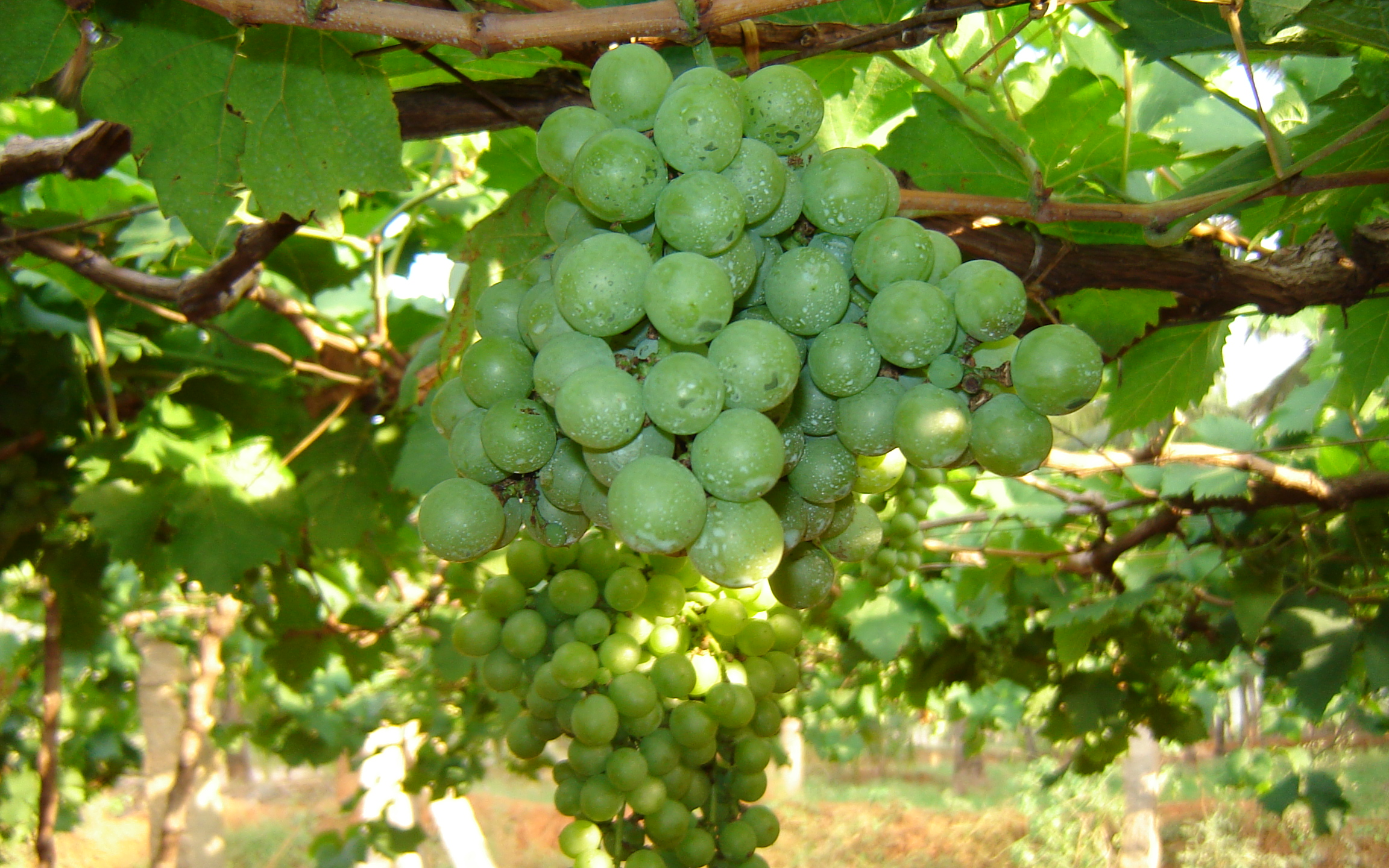
Grapes Cultivation.

Cotton spinning mills and sugar mills are the major industries in this district. In Andipatti Taluk, handloom weaving and power looms flourish, while in Uthamapalayam Taluk, the Highwavis Estate produces a large amount of tea. Bodinayakanur is a major market place for cardamom, coffee, tea and black pepper. The city is often called "Cardamom City" because of the large quantity of cardamom trade in this area. It has an auction centre for cardamom.

The Periyar and Surliar Hydro Power Stations and the Vaigai Micro Hydro Power Station have 181 MW installed capacity and actual power generation of 494 MW in 1996 in this district. Theni is one of the active business hubs in the western side of Tamil Nadu, inviting more industries to its locality. The district has 41.09 km of Metre gauge track serving 3 Railway Stations which connect to Madurai now converted to broad gauge. The Teni Junction Railway Station is the largest civilian railway station in the district.

== Politics ==
District	No.	Constituency	Name	Party	Alliance	Remarks
Theni	198	Andipatti	A. Maharajan	DMK	SPA	
Theni	199	Periyakulam (SC)	G. Sabari Iyngaran	TVK	SSJVA	
Theni	200	Bodinayakanur	O. Panneerselvam	DMK	SPA	
Theni	201	Cumbum	P. L. A. Jeganathmishra	TVK	SSJVA	

== Forest resources ==
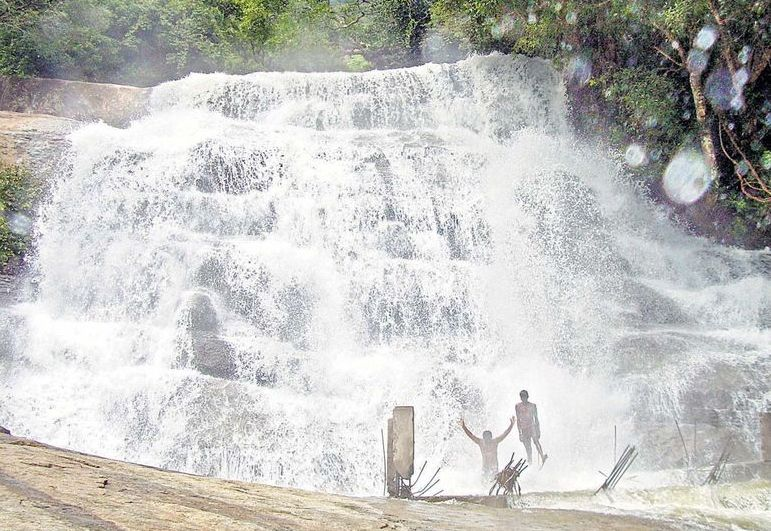
Meghamalai Falls.

The forest area in Theni district is about 33.70%. There are 27 forest areas in the district, constituting a total area of 795.81 km^{2} (307.26 sq mi). Of these, 19 areas fall under the Reserve Forest category with 255.44 km^{2} (98.63 sq mi) and 8 areas under Reserve Land category with 540.37 km^{2} (208.64 sq mi). Total area of forest (under green cover classification) was 806.86 km^{2} (311.53 sq mi). Dense forest and sparse forest are 292.81 km^{2} (113.05 sq mi) and 22.43 km^{2} (8.66 sq mi), respectively. About 44.65 km^{2} (17.24 sq mi) of artificial forest area are cultivated in the district. Wattle, softwood, fuel wood, cashew, neem, and tamarind are the main forest plantation species in the district. The forest area in the district is 1,179.29 km^{2} (455.33 sq mi), which is 40.98% of the total geographical area of the district. The Meghamalai Wildlife sanctuary, Srivilliputhur elephant reserve, and part of Kodaikanal Wildlife Sanctuary are situated in Theni district.

There has been no conservation of biological resources in the district. The information of wild life census in Theni district is yet to be made available.

== Demographics ==
Religions in Theni district (2011)
Religion	Percent
Hinduism	92.22%
Islam	4.56%
Christianity	3.02%
Other or not stated	0.20%

According to 2011 census, Theni district had a population of 1,245,899 with a sex-ratio of 991 females for every 1,000 males, much above the national average of 929. 53.81% of the population lived in urban areas. A total of 119,661 were under the age of six, constituting 61,873 males and 57,788 females. Scheduled Castes and Scheduled Tribes accounted for 20.72% and 0.15% of the population respectively. The average literacy of the district was 69.84%, compared to the national average of 72.99%. The district had a total of 338,112 households. There were a total of 591,642 workers, comprising 36,371 cultivators, 275,585 main agricultural labourers, 12,714 in house hold industries, 205,921 other workers, 61,051 marginal workers, 1,996 marginal cultivators, 39,576 marginal agricultural labourers, 2,225 marginal workers in household industries and 17,254 other marginal workers.

Languages of Theni district (2011)
1. Tamil (79.0%)
2. Telugu (12.8%)
3. Kannada (7.86%)
4. Others (0.35%)

At the time of the 2011 census, 79.04% of the population spoke Tamil, 12.75% Telugu and 7.86% Kannada as their first language.

== Places of interest ==
Periyakulam, Theni, Uthamapalayam, Cumbum, and Bodinayakanur are populous towns in the district.

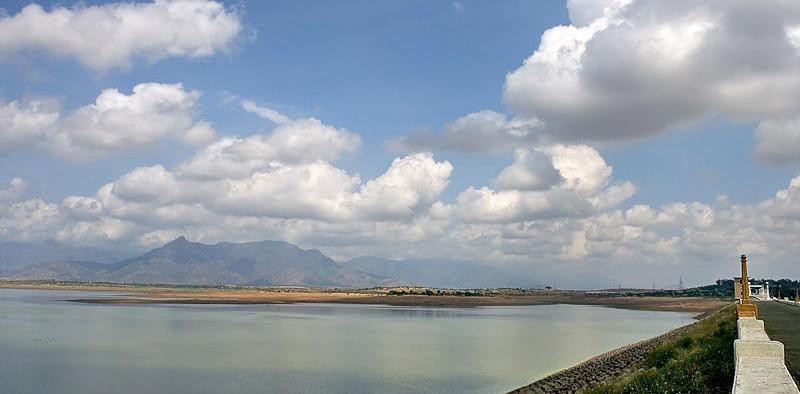
Vaigai Dam

1. Kolukku Malai (~64 31km from Theni)
2. Vaigai Dam (~16 km from Theni)
3. Suruli falls (~48 km from Theni)
4. Manjalar Dam(~33 km from Theni)
5. Meghamalai Hill (~60 km from Theni)
6. Peyathevar Canal Hill (~50 km from Theni)
7. Bodi Mettu Hill (~41 km from Theni)
8. Kumbakarai Falls (~28 km from Theni)
9. Sothuparai Dam (~26 km from Theni)
10. Shanmuganathi Dam (~39 km from Theni)
11. Chinna Suruli falls (~45 km from Theni)
12. Ramakkal Mettu(~3 km from Theni)
13. Kurankani (~ 31km from Theni)
14. HighWavys (~56 km from Theni)

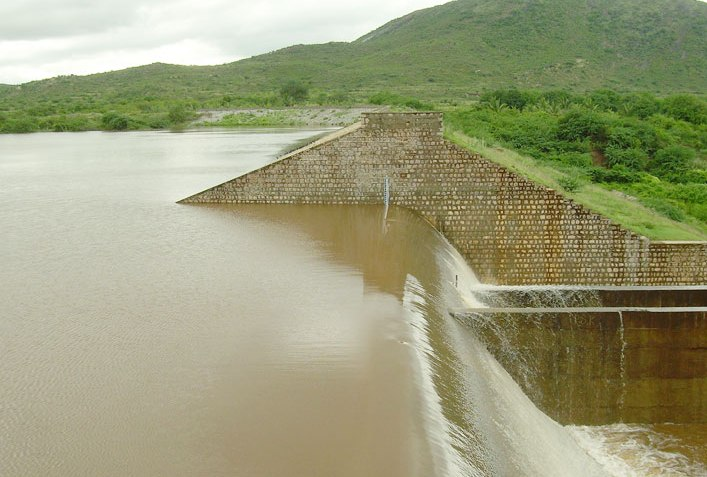
Shanmuganathi Dam

== Festivals ==
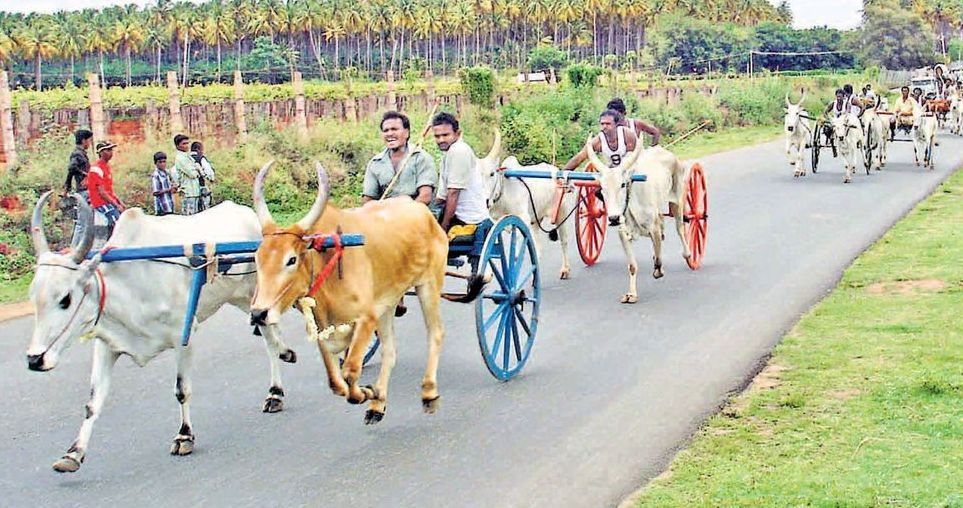
Bullock cart race held in Theni district

Theni district is home to many cultural festivals, celebrating both Hindu and local culture.

- The Karuppaswamy festival celebration at Anaipatti.
- Arilmigu Krishnan Kovil Thiruvizha in Purattasi thingal at Lakshmipuram (Jangal Patti Panchayat).
- B.Ammapatti, Kaliamman kovil is the famous god to solve problems and has a great festival on 1 April.
- The Ramzan Peru naal Thozhuhai at Periyakulam, Uthamapalayam, Cumbum, Devadhanapatti, Gudalur, Kottur, Bodinayakanur, Chinnamanur, Batalagundu in Theni. Mariyamman Temple Festival also famous.
- The celebration of "Gowmariyamman Temple" festival at Veerapandi and Cumbum during the month of May.
- Shri Bathirakaliyamman Chiththirai Thiruvizha Festival at Bathirakalipuram and visuvasapuram near Bodi.
- Shri Veerappa Ayyanar Festival during Chiththirai Thiruvizha at Theni-Allinagaram.
- Kamatchi Amman festival at Devadanapatti and Suyambu Saneeswara Bagavan and the month of Aadi every friday celebration on Temple festival at Kuchanur.
- Apart from Pongal celebrations in other areas, the birthday of John Pennycuick who built the MullaiPeriyar Dam is celebrated in Surulipatty and other places.
- Theni district is known for its celebration of Pongal, which is considered to be one of the most important festivals of Tamil Nadu. Pallavarayanpatti, Ayyampatti and Pudupatti is known for its Jallikattu during the Pongal festival.
- Another important festival is Chitra Pournami festival, which is celebrated at Sri Mangala Devi Kannagi temple, on the Western Ghats near Gudalur during the month of May.
- Other important festivals of the region are festivals of Masi Maham and Shivarathri which are celebrated in the Kamatchi Amman Temple during the months of February–March and kottur Ekadasi.
- Christmas and New Year are celebrated in Anaimalayanpatty.
- Chithirai Thiruvizha in which Lord Azhagar enters in the Vaigai River at Ambasamudram & Govinda Nagaram.
- Pankuni Thiruvizha in Gandamanur.
- Arulmigu Pattalamman, Kaliyamman, Karuppasamy temple festival in Kattunaickenpatty
- Uppukottai Varatharaja Perumal Kovil.
- Our Lady of Snow's Church festival celebration at Royappanpatti in the month of August.
- Holy spirit church in Hanumanthanpatti, they celebrate St. Xavier festival on 2 December every year.
- Manthaiyamman temple festival is celebrated in Gudalur(Melagudalur) of Theni district.
- Srinivasaka Perumal Kovil temple festival is celebrated in Silamalai(Bodi Taluk) of Theni district.
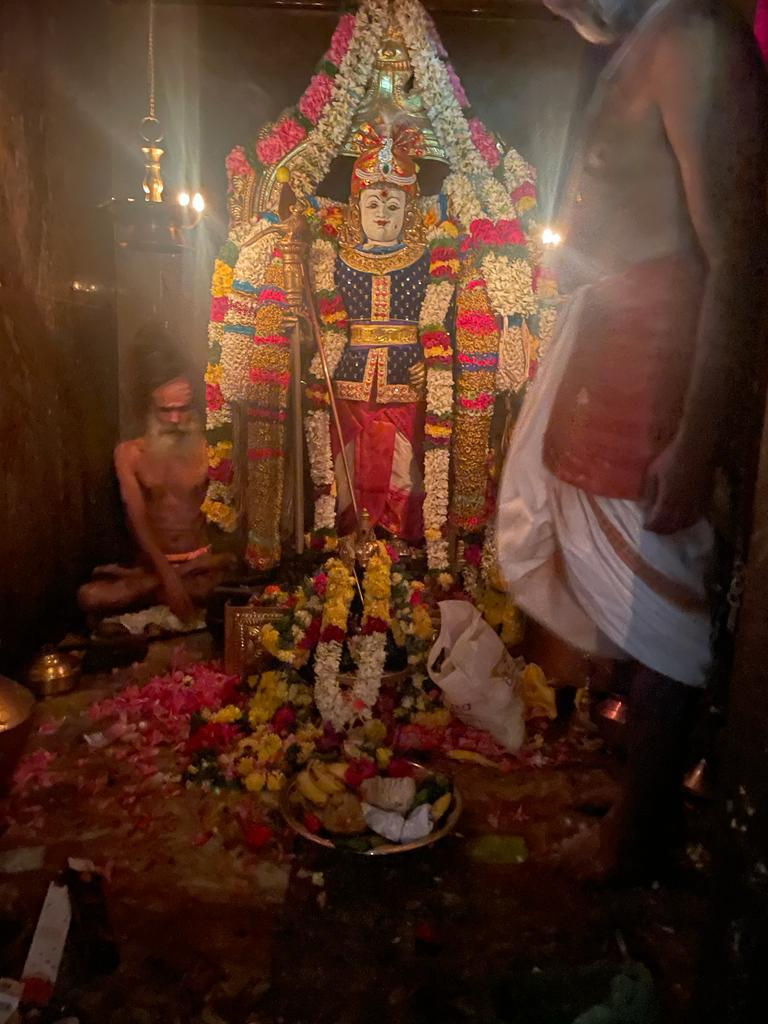
- Sri Guru Boga Eswara Ananda Swami is offering Pooja to Lord Shanmuganatha Swami
  Thai Poosam Festival at Shanmuganathar Temple at Kamayagoundanpatti.Siddar Sri Guru Boga Eswara Ananda Swami had visited this Temple during Thai Poosam Festival.

== Notable people ==
- Gangai Amaran - music composer, singer, lyricist, writer, film director and actor, born in Pannaipuram
- Bala - director, screenwriter, producer
- Bharathiraja - movie director, screenwriter, producer, actor
- Dhanush - film actor, director, screenwriter, lyricist, singer
- N. Eramakrishnan MLA, Cumbum
- Tarun Gopi - actor, film director, script writer
- Ilaiyaraaja - music director, singer, songwriter, instrumentalist, orchestrator, conductor-arranger and lyricist
- Raj Kapoor - director, actor
- Theni Kunjarammal - actor, singer, folk performer / singer
- N. Lingusamy - film director, screenwriter
- Marimuthu - actor
- R. Muthuraman - actor
- O. Panneerselvam - former Chief Minister, Deputy CM and Finance Minister of Tamil Nadu State
- Singam Puli - actor, comedian, film director, script writer
- P. T. Rajan - former CM of Madras state
- Suruli Rajan - actor, comedian
- Rajashekar - actor
- P. Ravindhranath - Member of parliament
- Selvaraghavan - film director, lyricist, screenwriter
- Sendrayan - actor
- Vairamuthu - Tamil poet, lyricist, author

== See also ==
- Kombai, Tamil Nadu
- List of districts of Tamil Nadu
