= Khalilur Rahman (disambiguation) =

Khalilur Rahman (born 1954) is a Bangladeshi diplomat, economist, and Minister of Foreign Affairs since 2026.

Khalil-ur-Rehman or Khalilur Rahman (Arabic: خليل الرحمن) may also refer to:

== Academia ==
- Khalilur Rahman Saharanpuri (died 1936), Indian Islamic scholar
- Khaleel-Ur-Rehman Azmi (1927–1978), Indian Urdu poet and literary critic
- Syed Khalil-ur-Rahman Sajjad Nomani (born 1955), Indian Islamic scholar

== Ectertainment ==
- Khalilur Rahman Babar (1952–2019), Bangladeshi actor
- Khalil-ur-Rehman Qamar (born 1956), Pakistani television playwright

== Military ==
- Syed Khalil-ur-Rehman (1904–1972), Pakistani defence minister
- Khalilur Rahman (general) (1927–2009), Bangladeshi army general
- Khalilur Rehman (governor) (born 1934), Pakistan Naval officer and provincial governor

== Politics ==
- Khalil ur Rahman (politician) (1936–2011), Hyderabadi politician
- Khalilur Rahman Chowdhury (Bangladeshi politician) (1947–2013), Bangladeshi politician
- Khalilur Rahman (Khulna politician) (fl. 1979–1986), Bangladeshi professor and politician
- Khalilur Rahman Chowdhury (Indian politician) (born 1954), Assam politician
- Abu Yusuf Mohammad Khalilur Rahman (fl. 1991–2018), Bangladeshi parliamentary whip and politician
- Khalilur Rahaman (born 1960), West Bengal politician
- Khalil-ur-Rehman (politician) (born 1988), Pakistani politician

== Other ==
- Khalil-ur-Rehman Ramday (born 1945), Pakistani judge
