= Shafeeq ur Rahman =

Indian entrepreneur

- Born: Hyderabad, India
- Education: Indian Institute of Management Bangalore; National Institute of Fashion Technology
- Occupations: Fashion entrepreneur; Film producer
- Years active: 2001–present
- Organization: Star life Hyderabad
- Spouse: Sahebzadi Maheen Nikhath
- Parent: Khalil ur Rahman (father)
- Awards: Global Icon Award by 'Passion Vista'; Man of the People Award by Mother Teresa Women's University

Shafeeq ur Rahman is an Indian Fashion entrepreneur and film producer. Rahman is also the city editor-in-chief of Hi Life Hyderabad. In February 2022, he was appointed city partner of international fashion and lifestyle broadcasting television channel Fashion TV.

== Early life and education ==
Shafeeq ur Rahman was born on to a well known political family of Hyderabad. His father Mohammed Khaleelur Rahman was a member of the Rajya Sabha and Ex Committee of Ministries Civil Aviation & Energy. He went to school in Hyderabad and completed his MBA at the Indian Institute of Management Bangalore before completing a Bachelor of Event Management at the National Institute of Fashion Technology.

== Television ==
Rahman has worked as a producer and co-producer in television projects including Savdhaan India, Crime Patrol and other television series.

Year	Title	Channel	Notes
2015	Zindagi Abhi Baaki Hai Mere Ghost	Life OK	Producer
2016	Dahleez	Star Plus	Producer
20017	Savdhaan India Crime Alert	Star Bharat	Producer
2018–2019	Fear Files: Darr Ki Sacchi Tasvirein	Zee TV	Producer
2018–2019	Crime Patrol (TV series)	Sony TV	Producer
2021	Nazar	StarPlus	Co-producer

== Awards ==
Year	Award	Notes	Result
2022	International Glory Award (IGA)	Most popular entrepreneur by Shilpa Shetty	Won
2019	Global Icon Award	by Passion Vista	Won
2019	Man of the People Award	by Mother Teresa Women's University	Won
