= Shembaganur Museum of Natural History =

- Location within Tamil Nadu
- Established: 1910; 116 years ago
- Location: Kodaikanal, Tamil Nadu, India
- Coordinates: 10.23°N 77.5°E
- Type: Natural history museum
- Founder: Sacred Heart College of Kodaikanal
- Owner: Sacred Heart College of Kodaikanal

Shembaganur Museum of Natural History is a natural history museum located in the Kodaikanal region of Dindigul district, Tamil Nadu, South India. Established in 1895, the museum houses an extensive collection of exhibits across the fields of anthropology, botany, zoology, and handicrafts.

== History ==
The was revitalized in 1951 by Father Ugarthe, a Spanish Christian missionary. It houses a preserved collection of 2,500 plant species and exhibits featuring more than 500 species of animals. Currently, this museum is maintained by the administration of Sacred Heart College.

== Visiting Hours ==
The museum is open for public during the following hours:

- Morning: 10:00 AM to 11:00 AM
- Evening: 3:00 PM to 5:00 PM
