= Kodaikanal Wildlife Sanctuary =

Wildlife sanctuary in Tamil Nadu, India

- IUCN category IV (habitat/species management area)
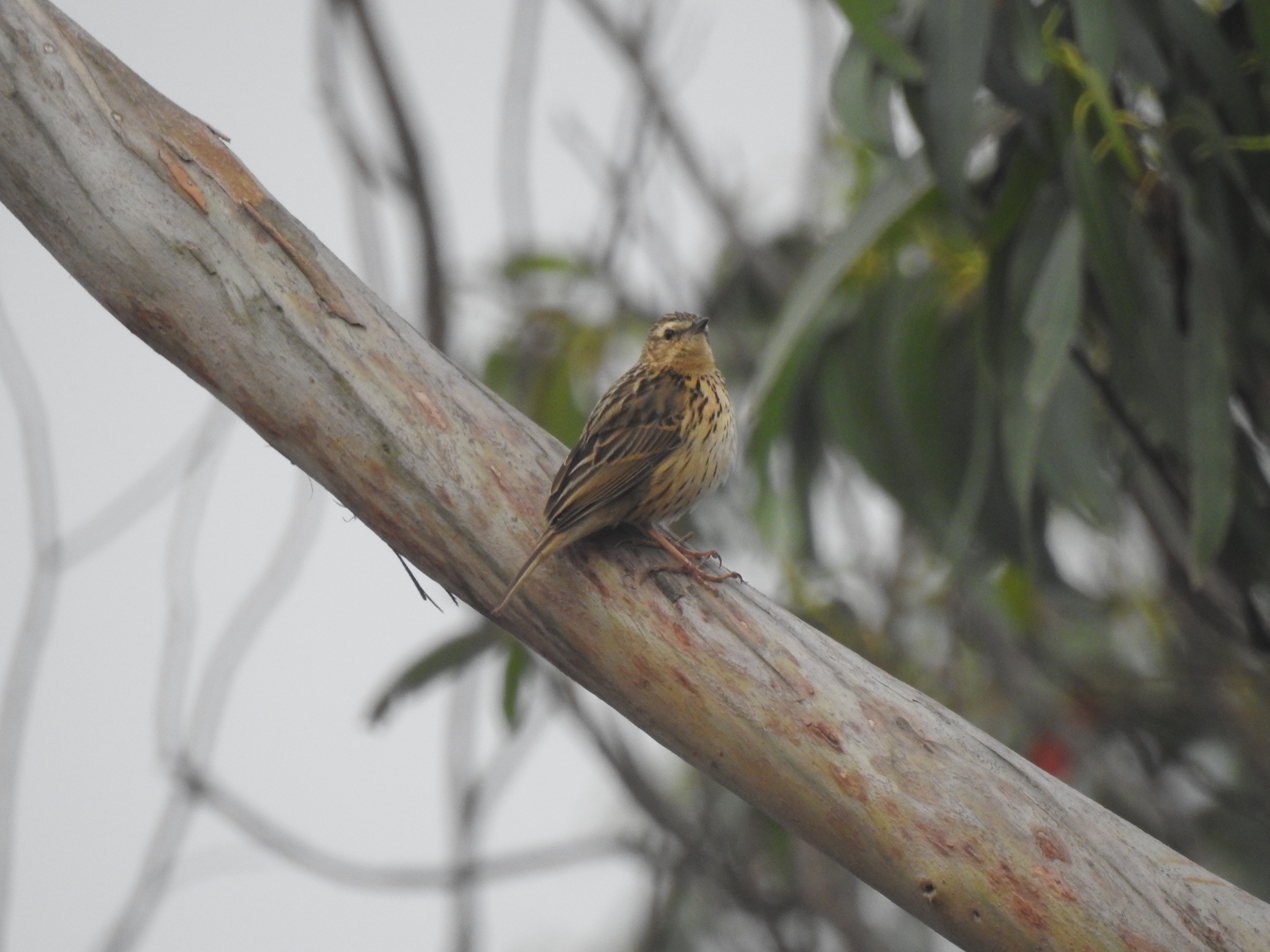
- Nilgiri pipit in Kodaikanal Wildlife Sanctuary

- Location within Tamil Nadu Location within India
- Interactive map of Kodaikanal Wildlife Sanctuary
- Location: Tamil Nadu, India
- Nearest city: Kodaikanal
- Coordinates: 10°23′N 77°48′E
- Area: 608.95 km^{2} (235.12 sq mi)
- Established: 20 September 2013
- Governing body: Tamil Nadu Forest Department

Kodaikanal Wildlife Sanctuary is a wildlife sanctuary located near Kodaikanal in Dindigul district of the Indian state of Tamil Nadu. The sanctuary was created in 2013 to preserve the biodiversity and various species endemic to the Western Ghats region, which is recognised as one of the world's biodiversity hotspots.

== Geography ==
The sanctuary covers an area of 608.95 km^{2} (235.12 sq mi) in the Palani Hills of the Western Ghats and is located in Dindigul district of the Indian state of Tamil Nadu. It was declared as a protected area in 2013 and spans across a diverse landscape with forests, grasslands, and various riverine ecosystems.

== Flora and Fauna ==
The sanctuary was created to preserve the biodiversity and various species endemic to the Western Ghats region, which is recognised as one of the world's biodiversity hotspots. The vegetation consists of a mix of dry deciduous, evergreen forests, grasslands interspersed with sholas. The sanctuary is home to a wide variety of plant species, including many species endemic to this region such as Ceropegia thwaitesii, Sonerila pulneyensis, Hoya wightii, Plectanthus bourneate, and Aeschnanthus perrottetii.

The sanctuary provides habitat to a range of animal species such as Indian gaur, leopard, sloth bear, Bengal tiger, Indian elephant, Nilgiri tahr, grizzled giant squirrel, and various species of deer, wild boar and reptiles. Avifauna include Nilgiri marten, blue-faced malkoha, stork-billed kingfisher, black-rumped flameback, white-browed bulbul, tawny-bellied babbler, pale-billed flowerpecker, honey buzzard, Indian eagle-owl, Malabar trogon, and Nilgiri flycatcher.

== Tourism and conservation ==
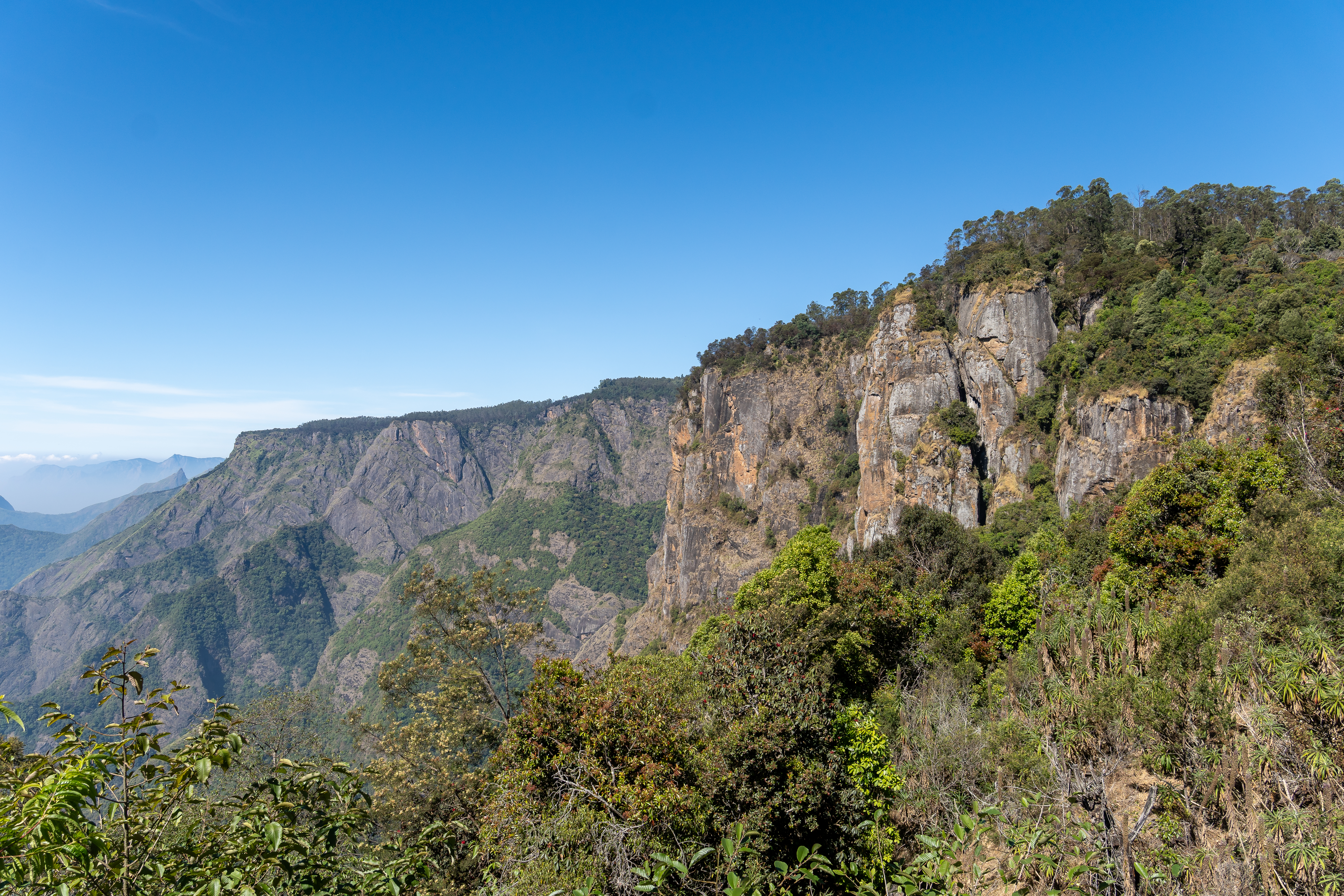
Kodaikanal Wildlife Sanctuary

The sanctuary is managed by the Tamil Nadu Forest Department, with the primary goals of protecting the unique ecosystem, ensuring sustainable practices, and managing the natural resources. Conservation efforts include anti-poaching measures, awareness programs, and habitat restoration projects. The sanctuary offers limited access to tourism activities such as trekking, guided safaris, and bird watching. Some of the popular spots in and around the sanctuary include Berijam Lake, silent valley view, and the pine forests. In 2017, a tree walk facility was proposed at the sanctuary to promote environmental education and allow visitors to learn about the sanctuary's flora in a guided setting.
