= Kodaikanal Golf Club =

Golf club in Tamil Nadu, India

- Club logo
- Interactive map of Kodaikanal Golf Club

Club information
- Location: Kodaikanal, Tamil Nadu, South India; 10°12′49″N 77°28′15″E
- Established: 17 June 1895
- Owner: Kodaikanal Golf Club
- Operator: Kodaikanal Golf Club
- Tota holes: 18
- Tournaments: Palani Hill Open, Veday Cup, Rudrappan Memorial Cup, Contessa Open, TAKE Solutions World Corporate Golf Challenge and A.V. Thomas Tournament
- Website: Kodaikanal Golf Club
- Par: 71
- Length: 6,426 yards (5,876 m)
- Course rating: 72

Kodaikanal Golf Club is a private membership club with an 18-hole, par 71 Golf course. It is located about 6 kilometres (4 mi) southwest from the center of Kodaikanal in Tamil Nadu, South India at an elevation of 2,220 metres (7,280 ft). The club is on Golf links Road near the popular view point 'Green Valley View' and 3 kilometres (2 mi) before the 'Pillar Rocks' viewpoint and flower garden.

This club is notable for its age and the wildlife frequently seen on the course. The club logo is two crossed golf clubs behind an indian tiger on a round yellow field, framed with "Kodaikanal Golf Club * Play the Game" imprinted in white on a dark green border.

== History ==
The club was established on 17 June 1895 by twelve British golfers. They were also the architects of the course. In the early years, members were British and American civil servants and missionaries. During the fifties it became a club tradition for the annual Captaincy to rotate between an Indian, an American and a Commonwealth citizen. This tradition continued until the late 70's, when the local expatriate population diminished. Originally there were only 9 holes and the putting surfaces were browns. In the early fifties the course was extended to 18 holes. In 1986 the putting surfaces were relaid with greens. The clubhouse, named the Centenary Building, was renovated in 1995.

== Facilities ==
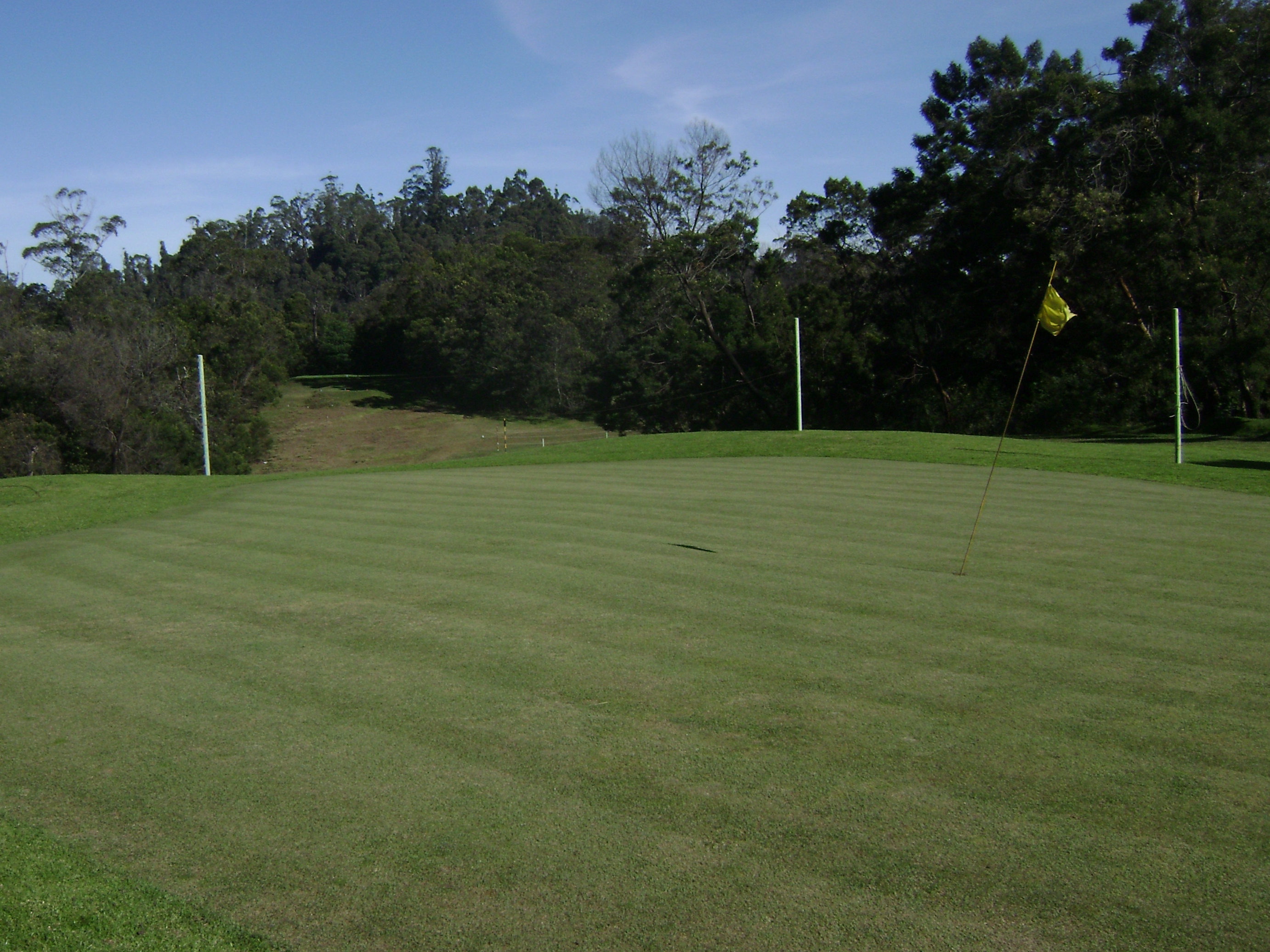
Groomed green at KGC

The Kodaikanal Golf club is a private membership club with over 600 members. The club has a range of facilities available for the recreation, entertainment and comfort of its guests. The main facility is the 18 hole golf course described below. There is a practice net for driving practice and a designated putting practice area.

Inside the clubhouse, for group activities there is a 12-seat conference room, a card games room, a billiards Room, a members lounge with fireplace, a BYOB bar and a dining hall. For members visiting from a distance, there is lodging available, including 2 super deluxe rooms, 2 deluxe rooms and 2 standard rooms.

== Golf Course ==
Non-members are allowed to play the full 18 holes by becoming temporary members or by paying the required green fees. Non-members must have a handicap or take lessons before they play here. The course is closed 15 April to 15 June.

This 18 hole, par 71 course covers about 150 acres (61 ha). Total length of the course is 6,426 yards (5,876 m) Some holes have interesting alternative names, depending on the challenges they offer to golfers. The 4th hole is also called the Devil's Dip, as the fairway from the tee-box to the green is a solid dip, which runs on as far as the eye can see. The 6th hole is named Tiger Hole because Tigers used to be sighted near it. The 12th hole is called the Cardiac Hole, due to the strenuousness of the walk. A "hard hitters" course, the 13th Twister green is not visible from the tee box. The 15th hole (New Long'un) which has the longest yardage of 587 yards (537 m), needs two long shots to sight the green.

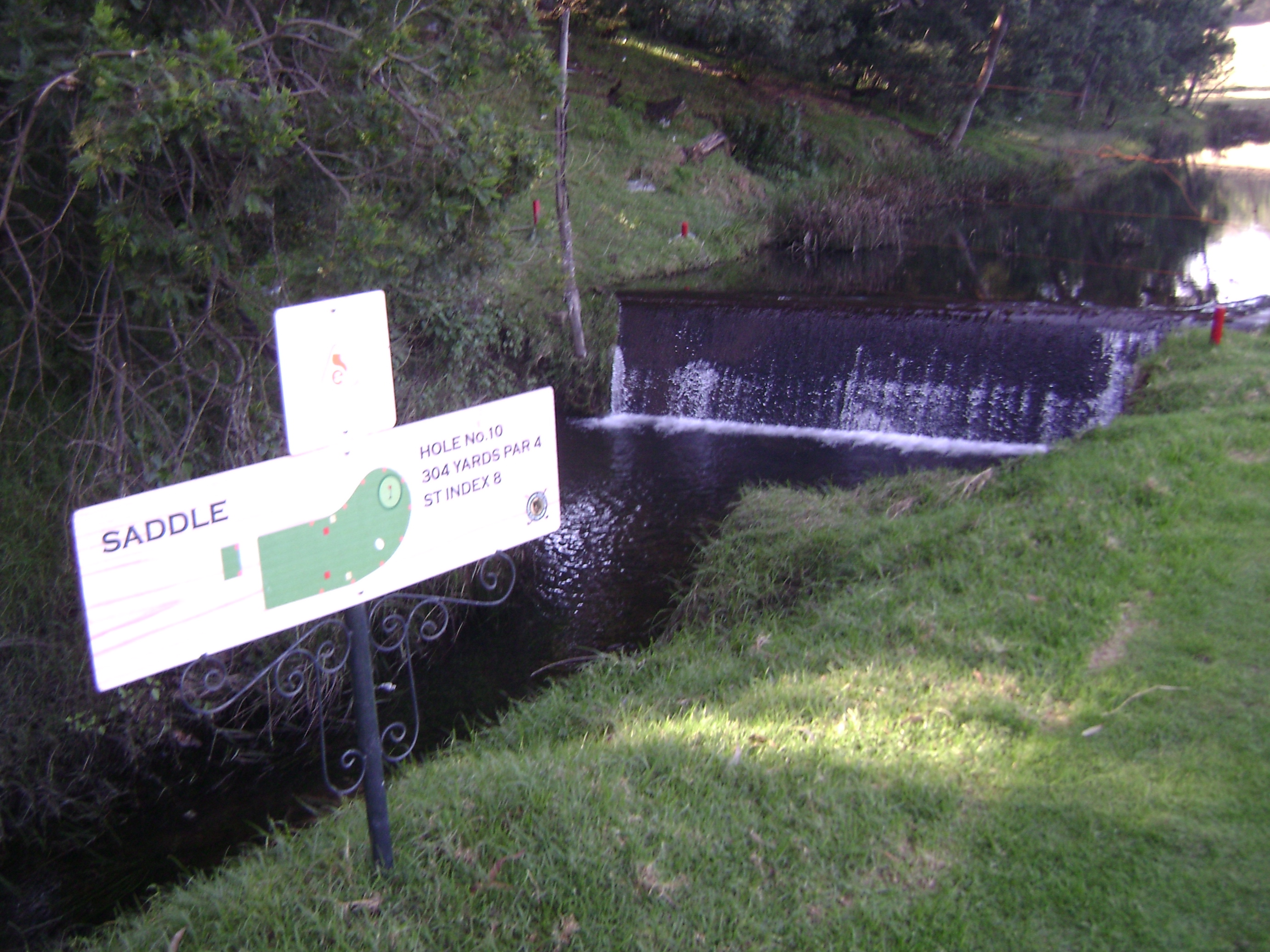
Saddle-10th hole, 304/244 yards, par 4, ST Index 8

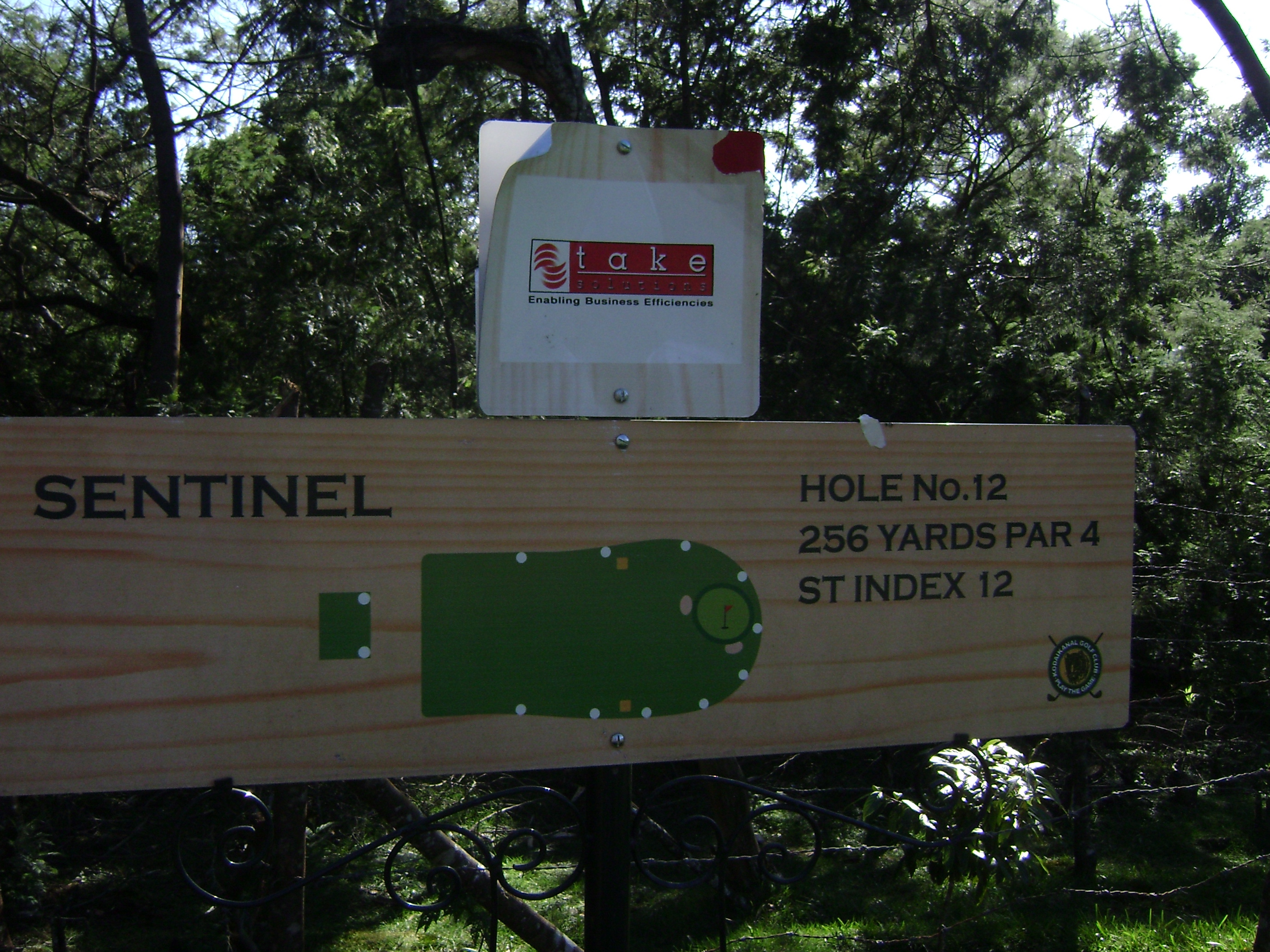
Sentinel, 12th hole, 256/226 Yards, Par 4, ST Index 12

Hole	Name	Gents		Ladies		Par
Hole	Name	yards	metres	yards	metres	Par
1	Old Long'un	350	320	292	267	4
2	Plateau	218	199	203	186	3
3	Hoping	231	211	184	168	3
4	Devil's Pit	383	350	333	304	4
5	Pulpit	322	294	260	240	4
6	Tiger	441	403	372	340	4
7	Hill Side	489	447	462	422	5
8	Punch Bowl	167	153	161	147	3
9	Pimples	496	454	458	419	5
10	Saddle	304	278	244	223	4
11	Overhill	162	148	145	133	3
12	Sentinel	256	234	226	207	4
13	Twister	344	315	302	276	4
14	Majestic	175	160	171	156	3
15	New Long'un	561	513	516	472	5
16	Roadside	524	479	388	355	5
17	Sure Shot	160	150	143	131	3
18	Home	526	481	437	400	5
	Total:	6,109	5,586	5,297	4,844	71

It takes about 3 hours to play the entire course.

== Tournaments ==
In 2008 fifty-six tournaments were conducted daily between mid-April and early June. Palani Hill Open, Veday Cup, Rudrappan Memorial Cup, Contessa Open and A V Thomas Tournament (introduced recently), are some of the major tournaments. The 2008 Addicts Golfing Society of Southern India 3 day Kodaikanal meet had 108 entries and 5 competitions. The first regional round of the 'TAKE Solutions World Corporate Golf Challenge' was played in Kodaikanal on 29 December 2010.
