= Kodaikanal Lake =

Artificial lake in tamilnadu

- Kodai Lake
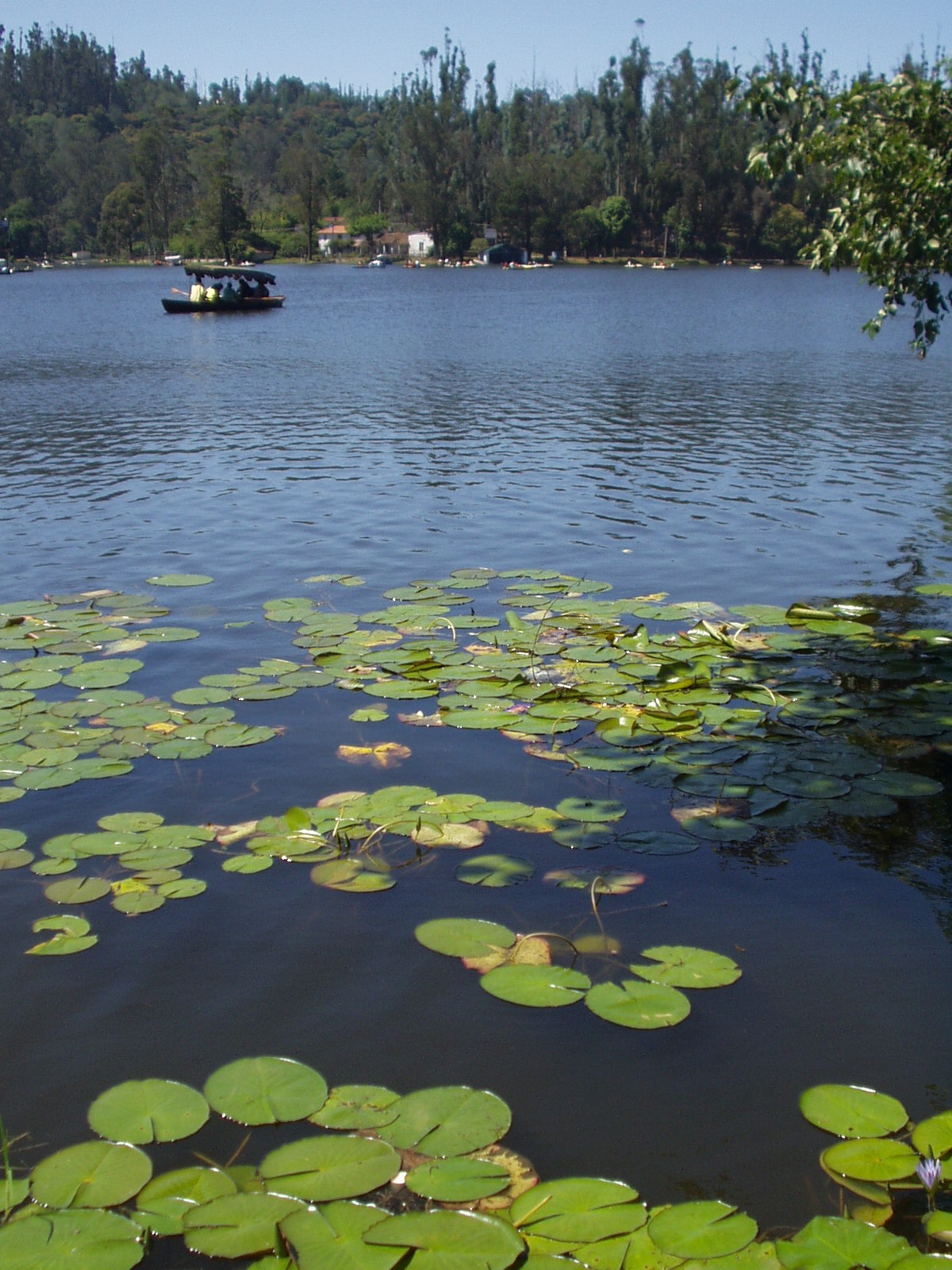

- Location within Tamil Nadu
- Location: Kodaikanal, Dindigul district, Tamil Nadu
- Coordinates: 10.2344°N 77.4863°E
- Basin countries: India
- Surface area: 24 ha (59 acres)
- Average depth: 3 m (9.8 ft)
- Max. depth: 11 m (36 ft)
- Shore length^{1}: 4.4 km (2.7 mi)
- Surface elevation: 2,133 m (6,998 ft)
- Settlements: Kodaikanal
- ^{1} Shore length is not a well-defined measure.

Kodaikanal Lake, also known as Kodai Lake, is a manmade lake located in the Kodaikanal city in Dindigul district in Tamil Nadu, India. Sir Vere Henry Levinge, the then Collector of Madurai, was instrumental in creating the lake in 1863, amidst the Kodaikanal town which was developed by the British and early missionaries from USA. The lake is said to be Kodaikanal's most popular geographic landmark and tourist attraction.

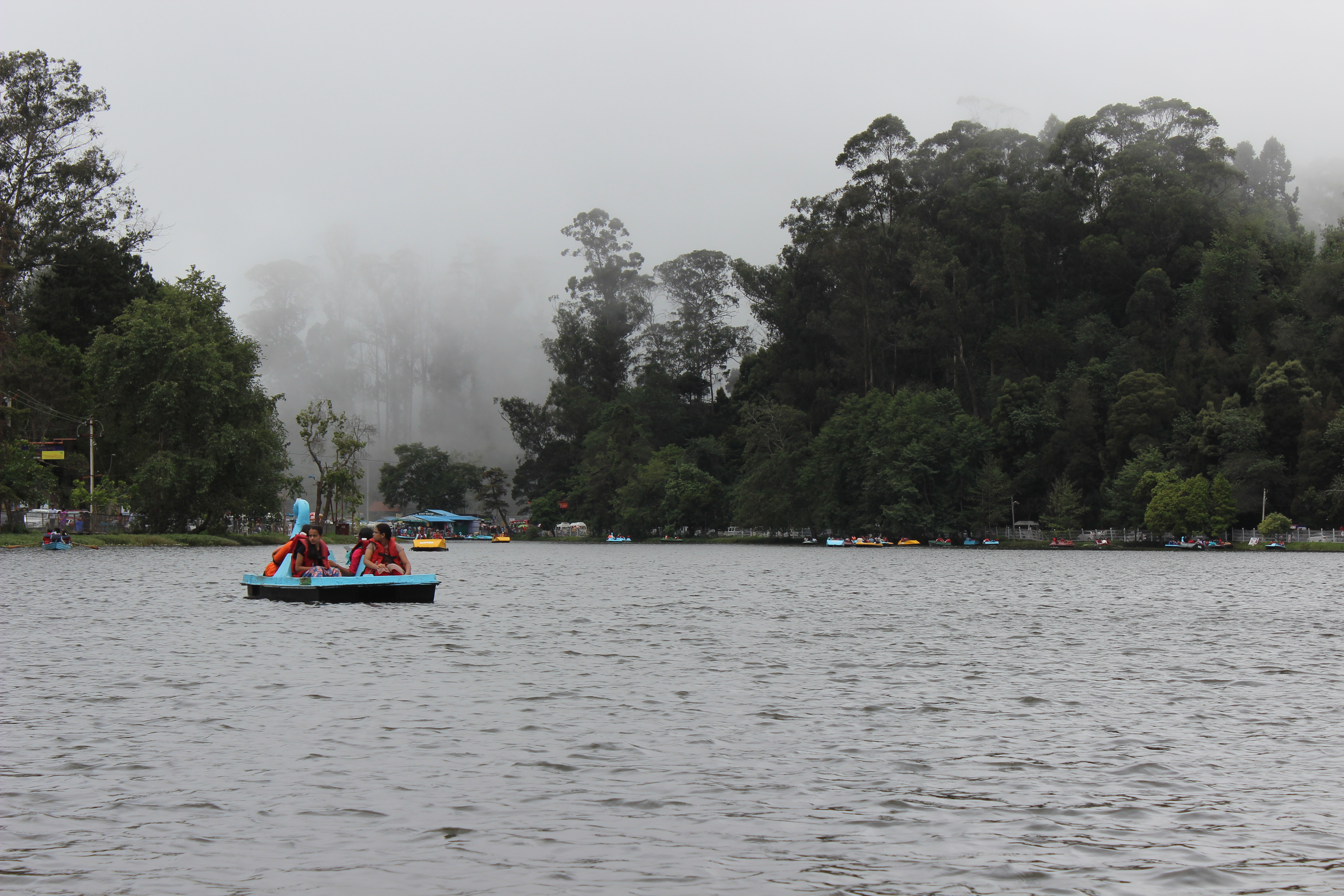
Boating in Kodaikanal Lake

Over the years a boat club, boathouse and boat service (with rowing boats and pedalling boats and a public ferry) for the public and tourists has become fully functional and is of aesthetic significance for tourism. Boat Pageant and Flower Shows are a regular feature in the summer season which attracts tourists. Bryant Park is situated adjacent to the lake.

== Access ==
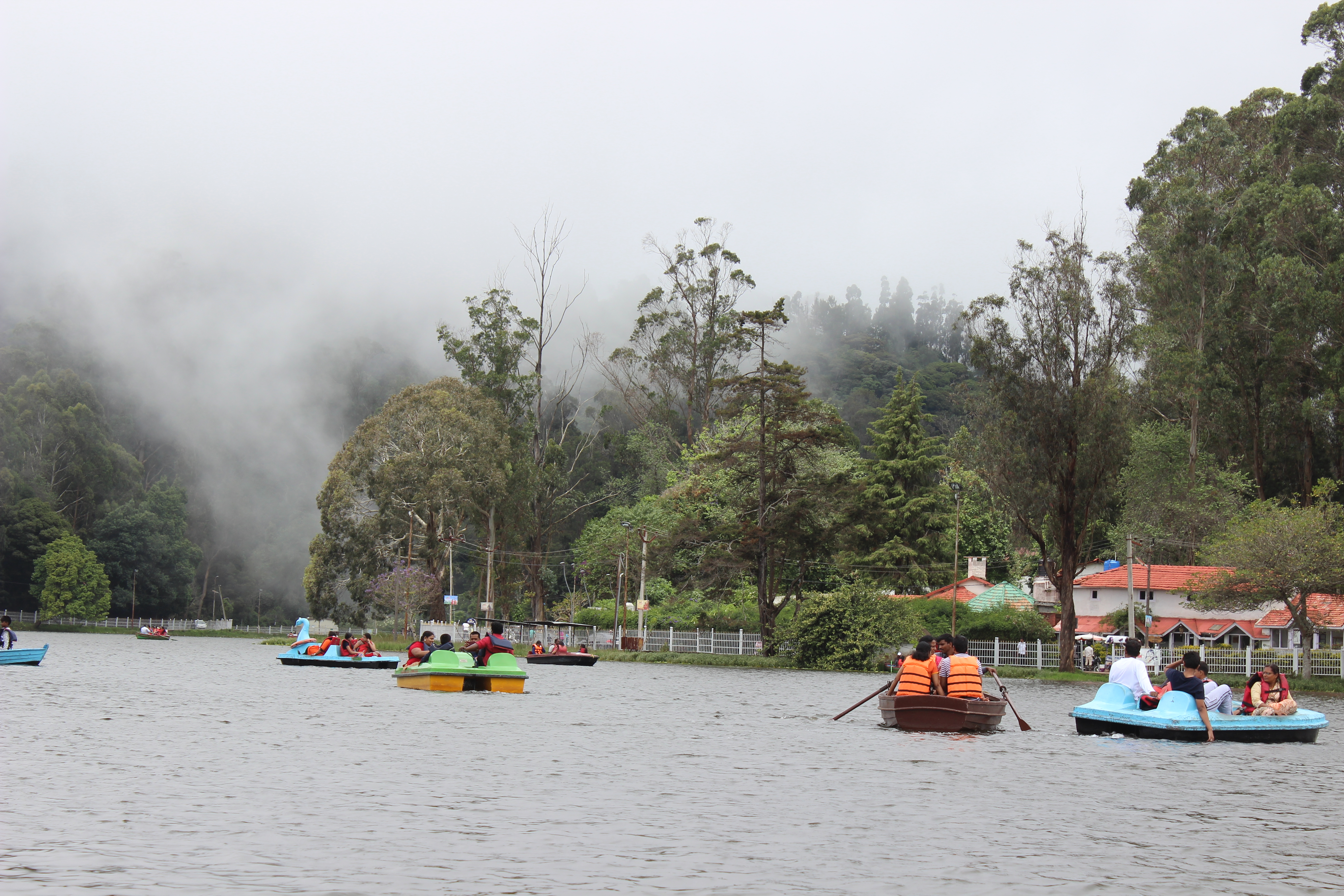
Boating in Kodaikanal Lake with Mist

A railway line extended from Chennai to Tirunelveli with an intermediate station at Ammaianayakkanur (later renamed Kodai Road) was built in 1875, to provide a gateway to Kodaikanal town and there on to the lake through a foot trek of 18 km from the railhead. The nearest railheads to the lake presently are the Kodai Road railway Station at 80 km and the Palani Railway station at 64 km distance, from the town. Madurai (at 121 km) and Coimbatore (at 135 km) airports are the closest to the Lake. Kodai Lake is well connected by road with regular bus services operating to Dindigul, Madurai, Palani, Kodaikanal Road, Theni, , Thiruchirapalli, Kumili, Munnar, Erode, Bangalore and Coimbatore.

== Topography ==
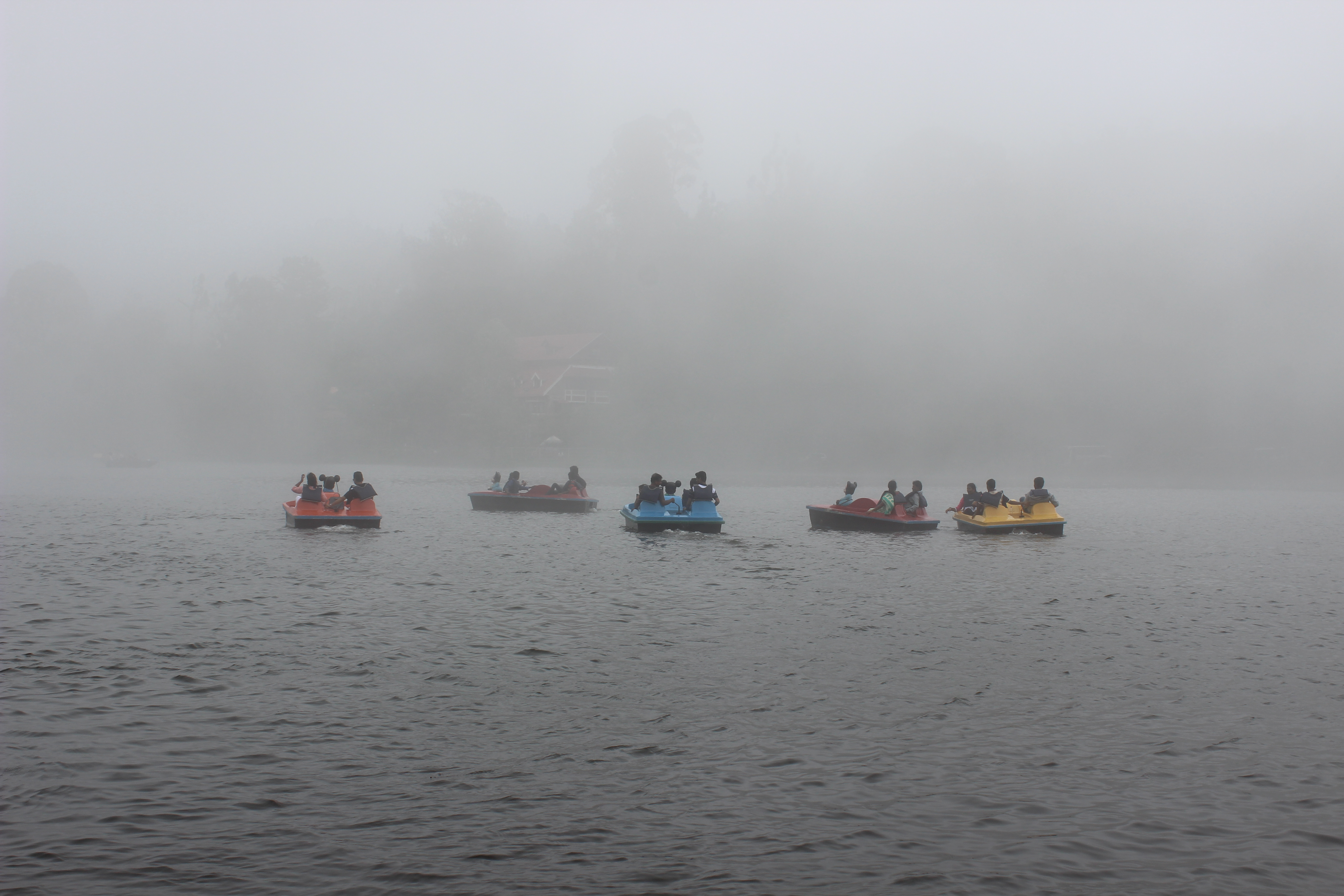
Boating in Kodaikanal with Mist falling in lake

The lake is star-shaped, centrally located in the town of Kodaikanal and is surrounded by lush green hills of the northwestern Palani Hills range, which is the main watershed for the lake.

== Hydrology ==
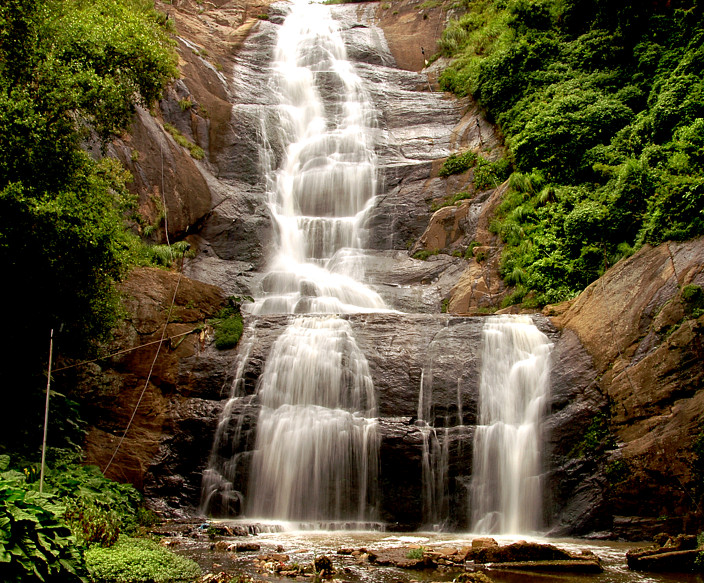
Outflow from the lake goes over the Silver cascade fall.

An earthen dam was constructed to create the lake in a marshy where three streams flowed. The lake catchment experiences an average annual rainfall of 1650 mm. The climate is salubrious with summer temperatures of 19.8 °C (max) and 11.3 °C (min) and winter temperatures of 17.3 °C (max) and 8.3 °C (min). The out flow from the Lake forms the waterfall of 60 metres, called the Silver Cascade, 8 km downstream of the lake outlet.

== Flora ==
Kurinji (Strobilanthes kunthiana), a unique flowering plant is reported from the catchment area of the Lake. It is reported that this flower last bloomed in 2004 and that it blooms once in 12 years. Hill-plantain fruits and plums are popular in the area.

== Aqua fauna ==
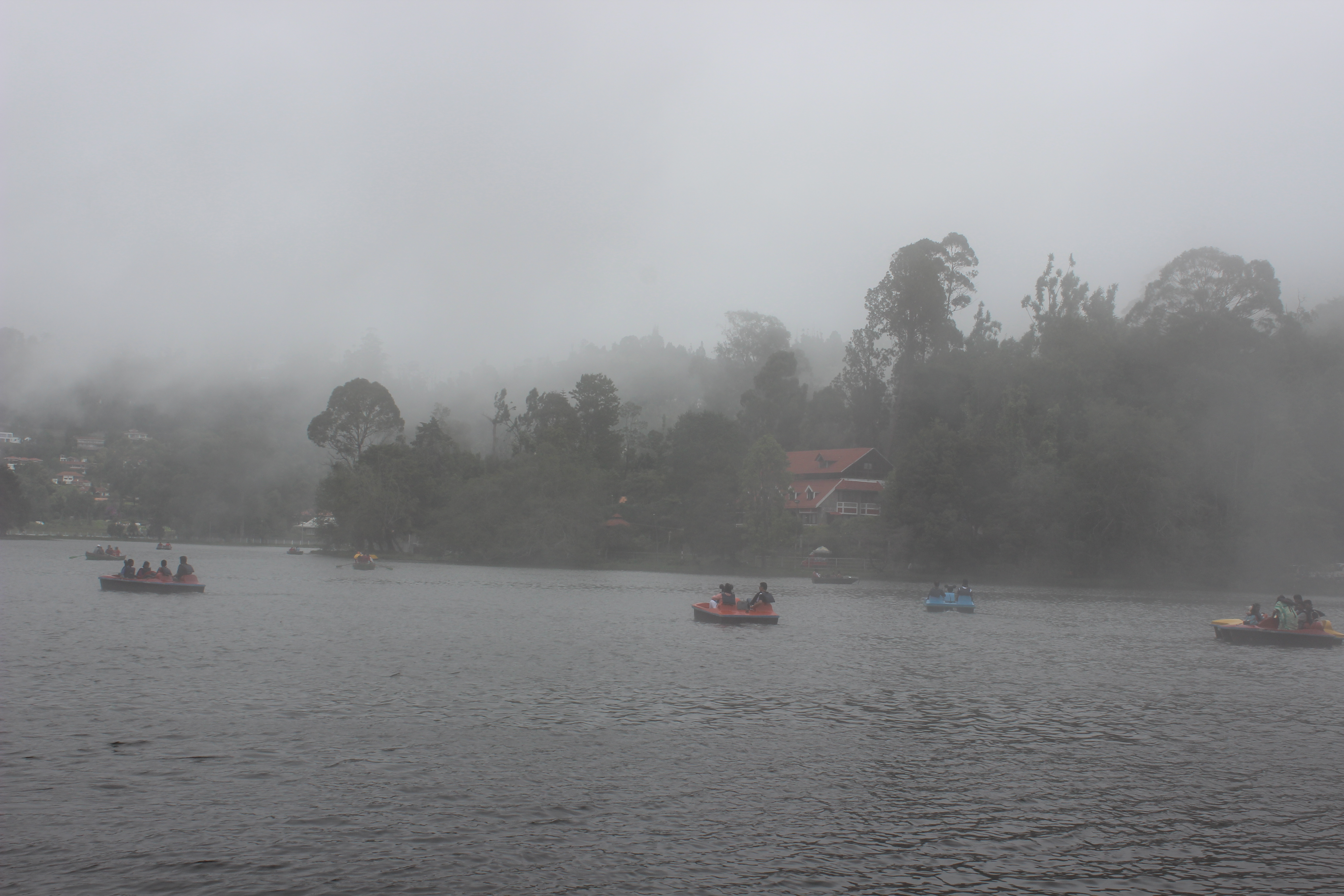
Mist covering the boating in Kodaikanal Lake

The Lake has moderate to dense growth of macrophytes of all types. The littoral zone of the lake is reported to be rich in periphytic biota associated with macrophytes. Diatoms, protozoans and rotifers which are also associated with macrophytes are found in the lake. Many aquatic insect larvae and adults, molluscs, cladocerans and the fish Danio aequipinnatus, Rasbora, one spot barb, daniconius and Gambusia affinis are reported. Rainbow trout and common carp are the main fish found in the lake. The fish yield as per records was 5.3 kg/ha/year. Recently two new species of diatom was found in this lake.

== Condition of the lake ==
Human health risk assessment of the physico-chemical parameters of the lake water reveals that:

1. A study conducted by the Department of Atomic Energy confirmed that Kodaikanal Lake has been contaminated by mercury emissions by the thermometer factory of Hindustan Unilever Limited.
2. As per microbial analysis, the water is not potable and needs to be processed prior to domestic use.
3. Several ecological factors have influenced the plankton diversity and abundance.
4. Eight aquatic macroinvertebrate taxa have been identified.
5. Tourists and nearby residents are causative factors for lake contamination and water pollution;
6. Encroachment of the banks of the lake by buildings has violated the court order which prohibits constructions within 70 metres from the banks of the lake;
7. The impact on the quality of water is transitory as compared to closed water body.
8. High pollution loads of organic matter from hotels and other commercial establishments around the lake are causing pollution.

== Lake conservation plan ==
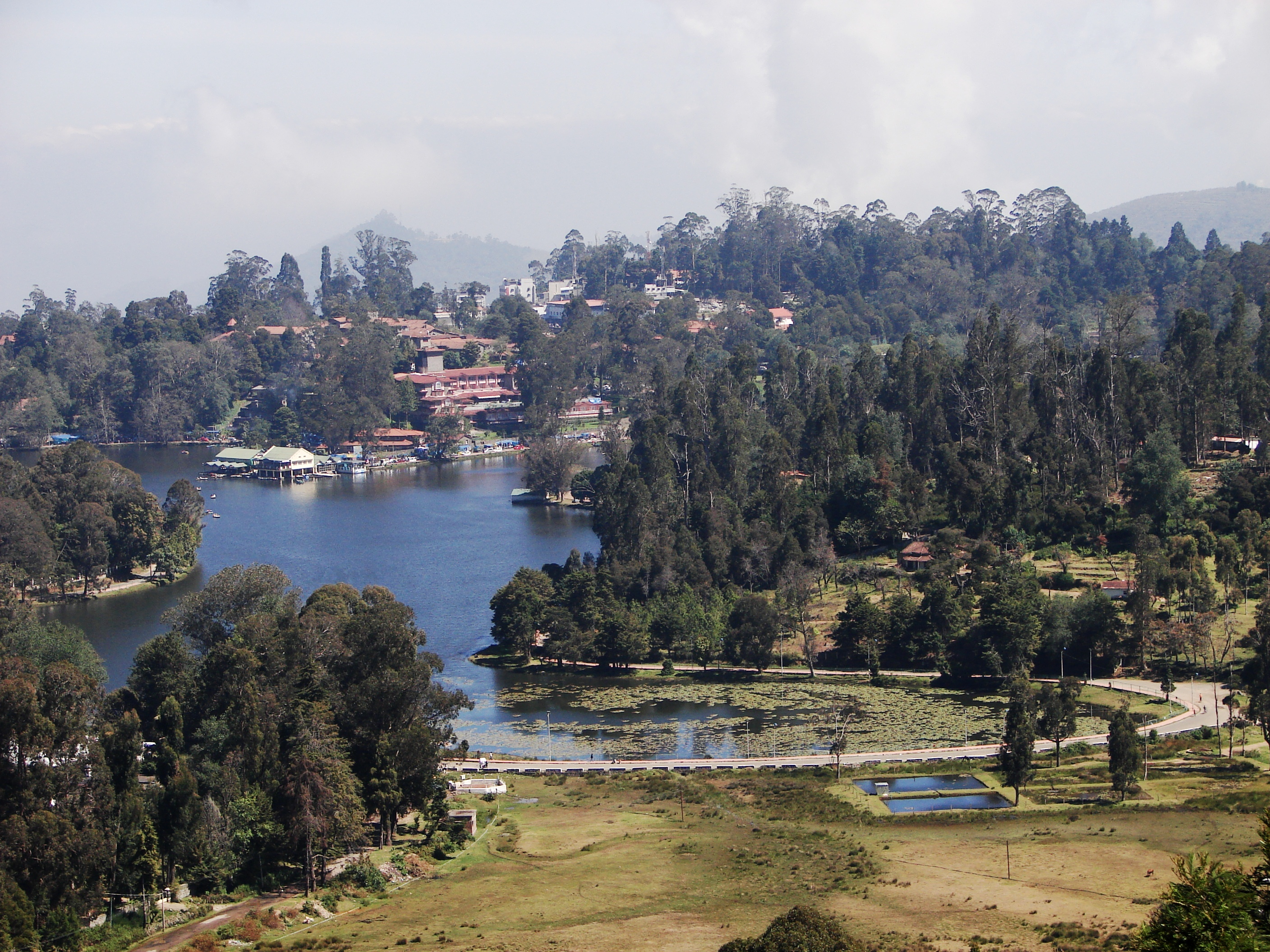
Panoramic view of Kodaikanal Lake and the surrounding Kodaikanal town

The Ministry of Environment & Forests, Government of India has initiated a Centrally Sponsored Scheme called the National Lake Conservation Plan (NLCP), since June, 2001, on 70:30 cost sharing basis between the Central Government and the respective State Government, with the objective of restoring and conserving the polluted and degraded lakes in urban and semi urban areas in the country. On the basis of studies carried out, 62 lakes including the Kodaikanal Lake in Tamil Nadu have been identified as polluted and degraded requiring conservation.

Treatment and eco-restoration works for the Kodaikanal Lake were undertaken by the Government of Tamil Nadu with funds provided by the Govt. of India, under the above stated cost sharing formula, by the National Lake Conservation Plan (NLCP) of the Ministry of Environment and Forests, to abate pollution and, thereby benefit the local and floating population. The project envisaged Bio remediation, Sewage Treatment, Low cost sanitation Facilities, awareness, de- Weeding, Interception and Diversion Works, Fencing, Horse sheds, Data Collection and Dredging, at a total cost of about Rs 10.33 crores (US$2.6 million).

== Gallery ==
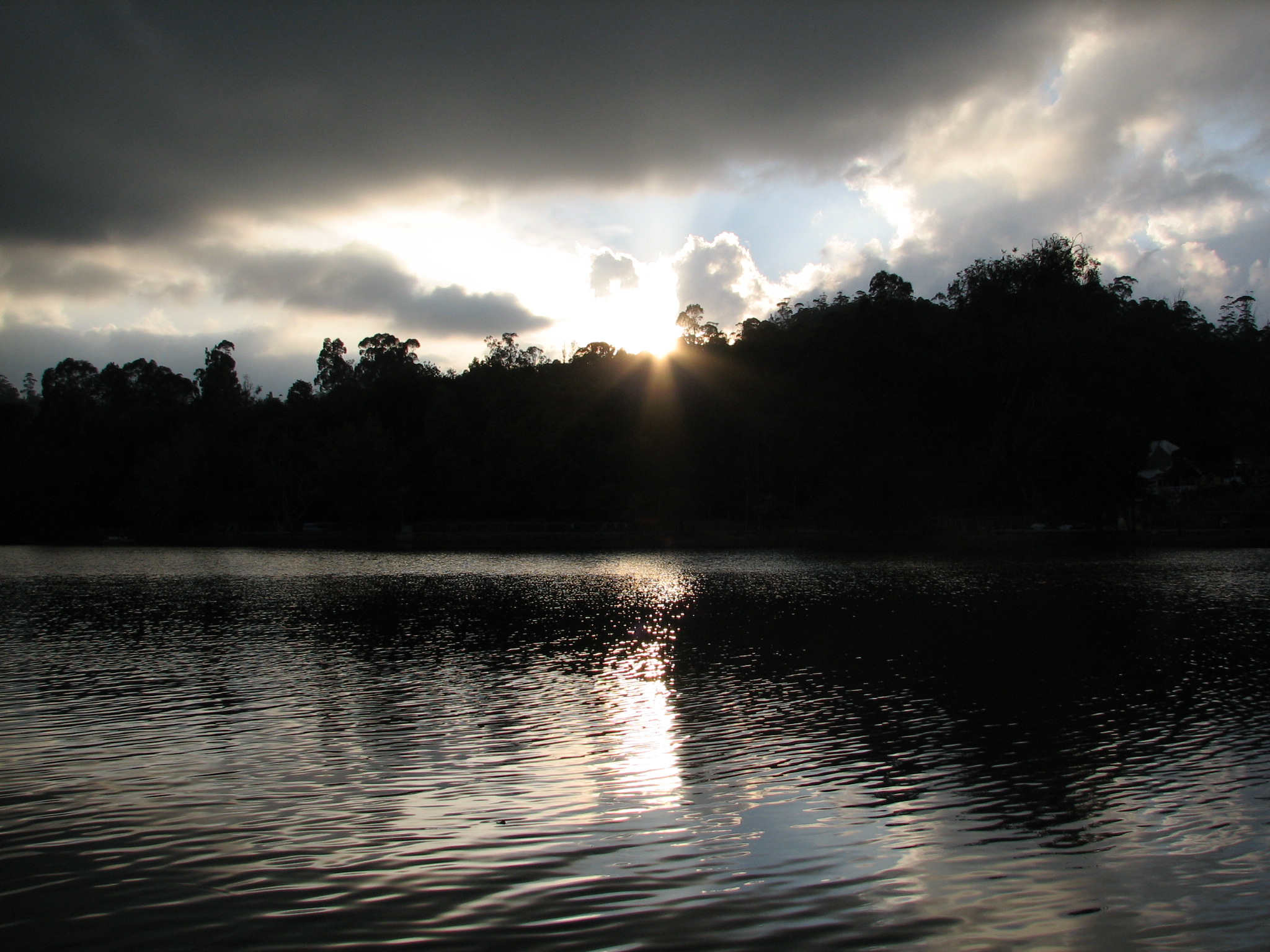
Kodaikanal Lake at sunset

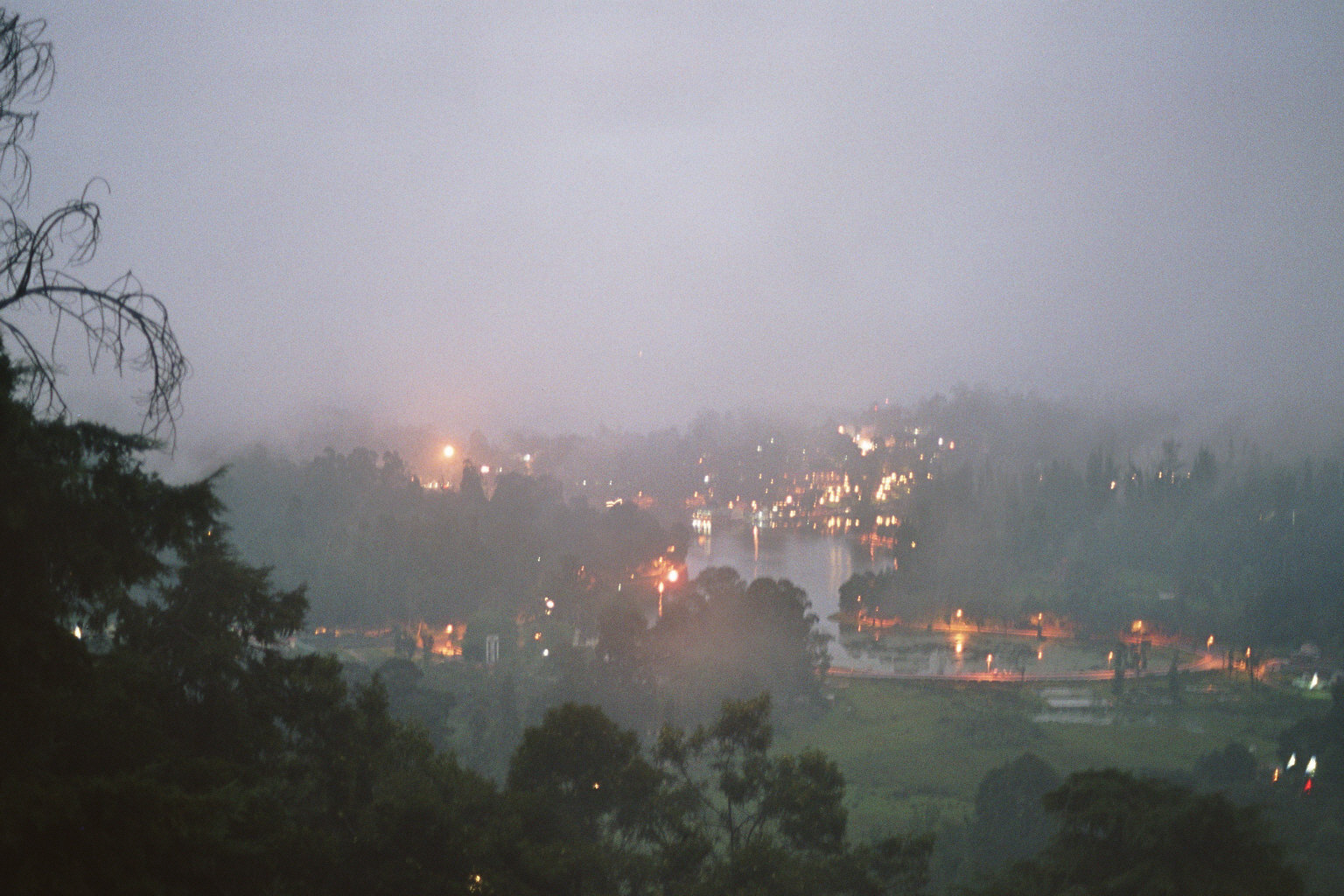
View of Kodaikanal Lake at night

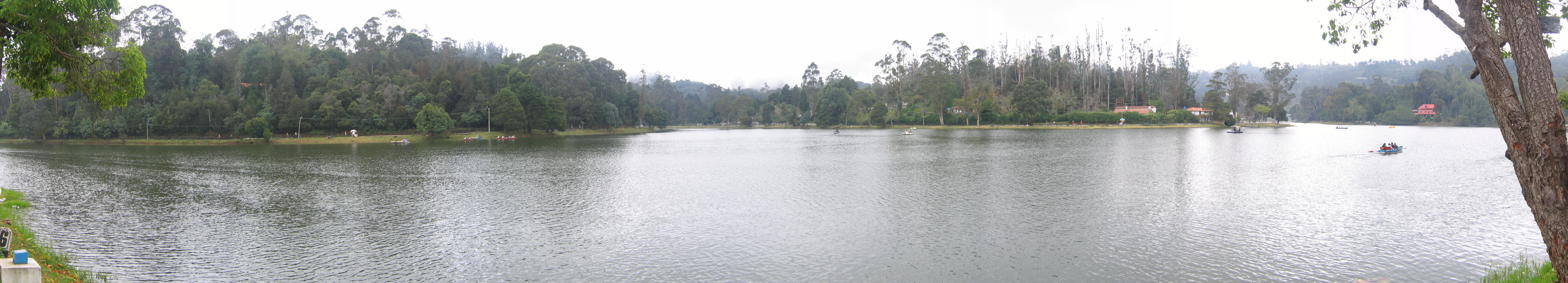
View of the lake

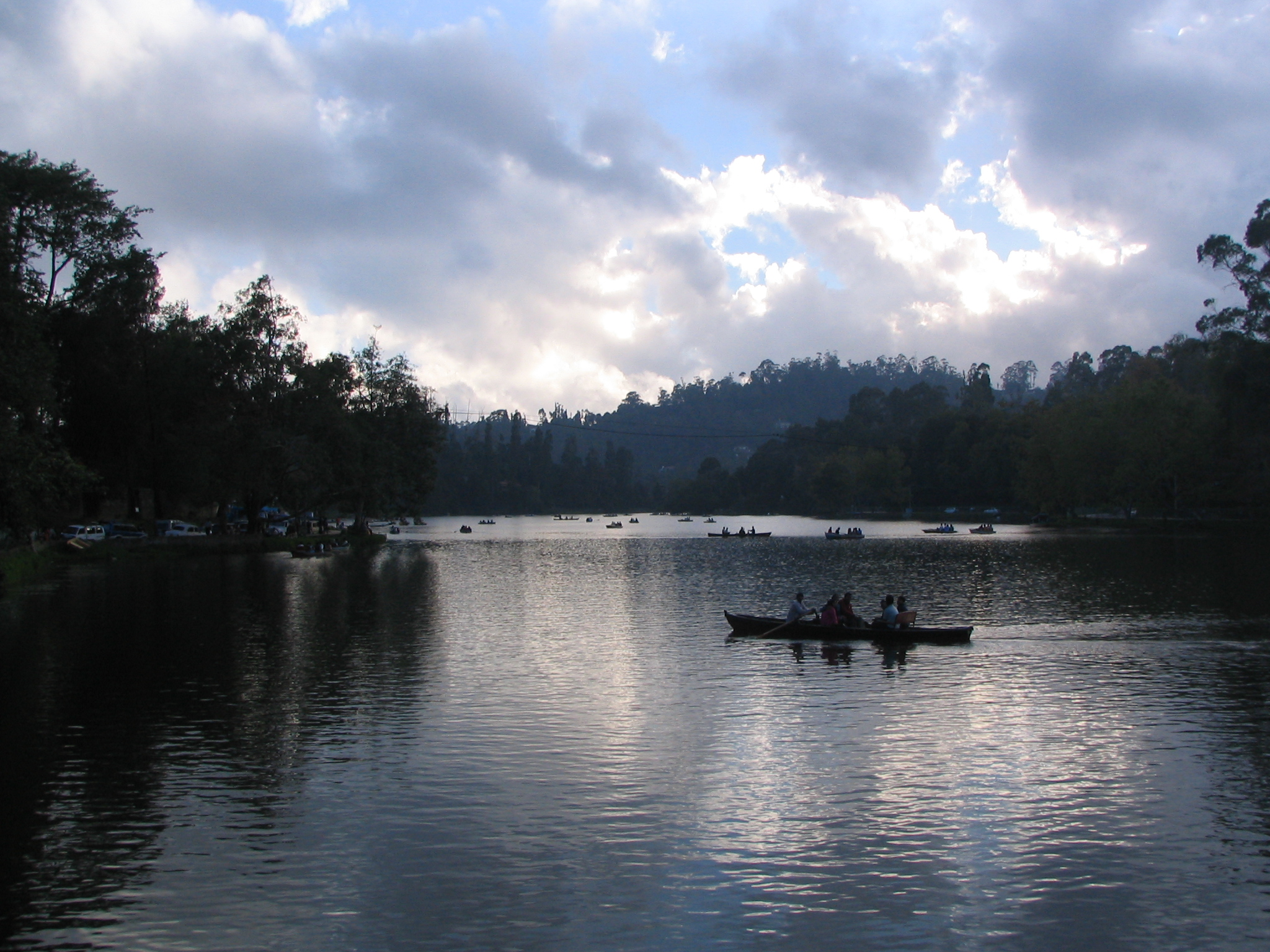
Boating in the Lalakeke

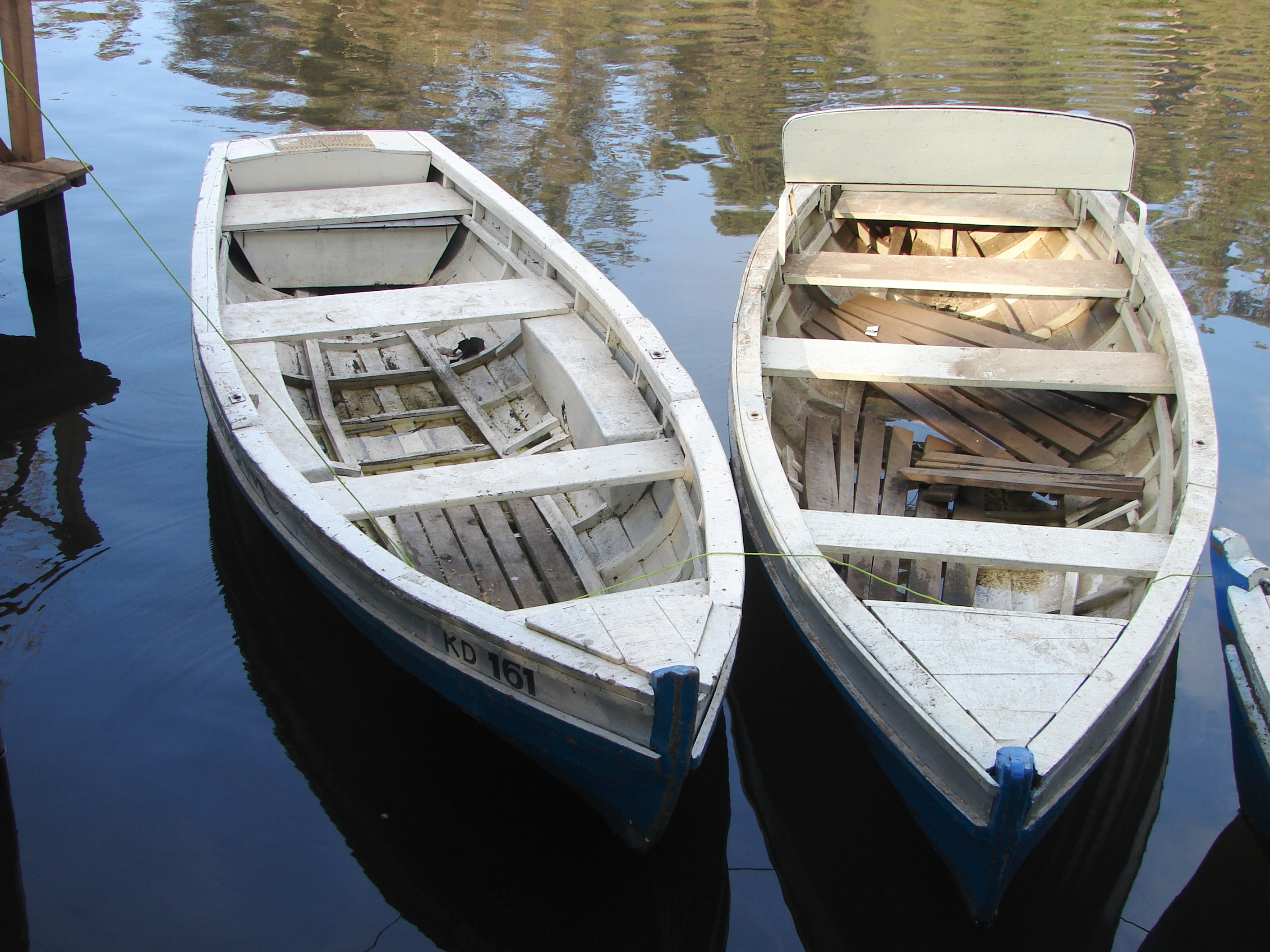
Boats moored in the lake

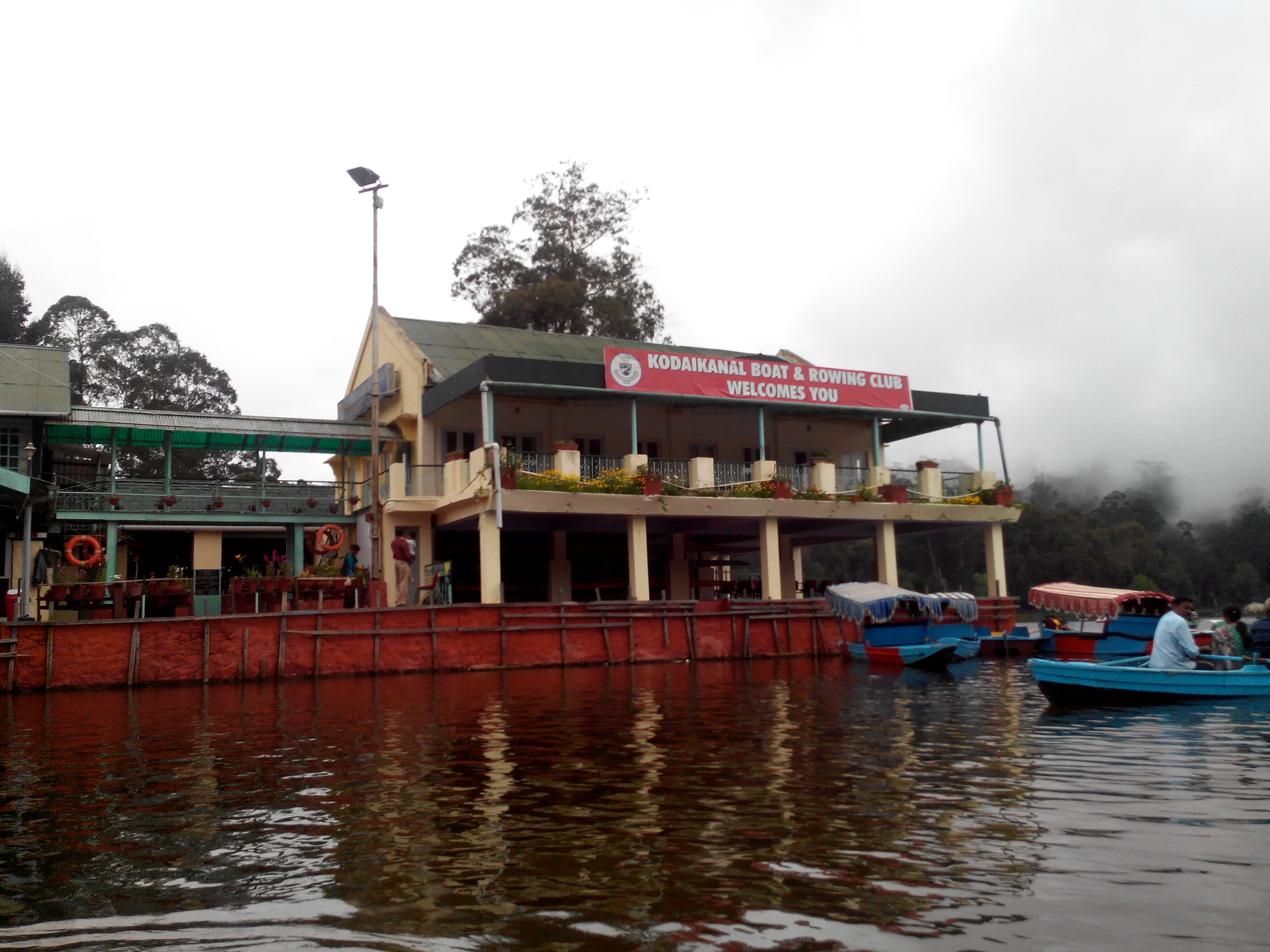
The Kodaikanal Boat and Rowing Club

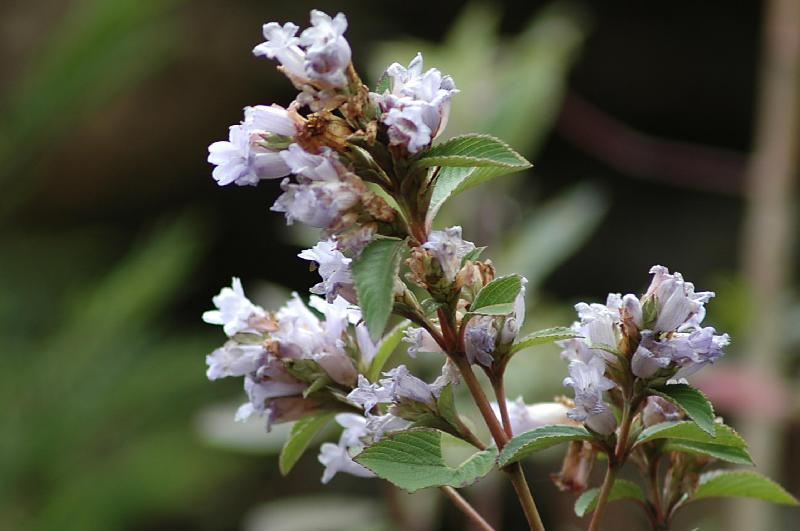
Strobilanthes kunthiana or Kurinji flower which blooms once in 12 years in the lake's surrounding Palani Hills ranges

== See also ==
- Kodaikanal
- Dindigul district
- Palani Hills
- Palani Hills Wildlife Sanctuary and National Park
- Pannaikadu
