= Mother Teresa Women's University =

Public university in Kodaikanal, Tamil Nadu

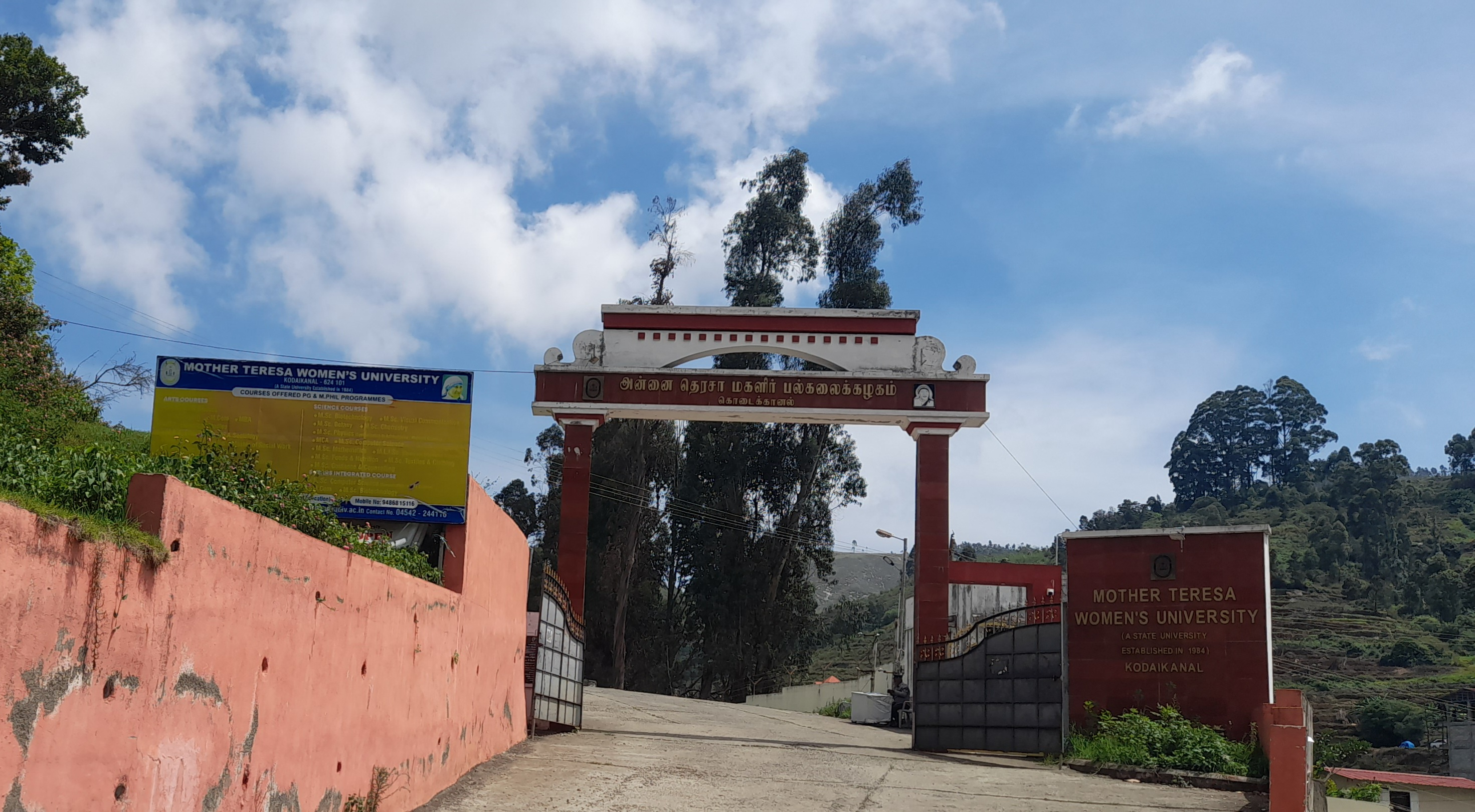
- Motto: "Empowerment of Women through Education"
- Type: Public
- Established: 1984; 42 years ago
- Affiliations: UGC
- Chancellor: Governor of Tamil Nadu
- Vice-Chancellor: K. Kala
- Location: Kodaikanal, Tamil Nadu, India, 624101, India; 10.2688461°N 77.4807062°E
- Campus: Rural
- Website: www.motherteresawomenuniv.ac.in

Mother Teresa Women's University, a state university of the Government of Tamil Nadu, is situated at Kodaikanal, in the Palani hills of South India. It was established in the year 1984 by the enactment of Tamil Nadu Act 15. It monitors and offers consultancy services and research in Women's Studies.

The university offers distance education courses. The School of Distance Education of Mother Teresa Women's University was started in 1988 at Kodaikanal. It has its jurisdiction over districts of Dindigul and Theni.

== Courses ==
These courses are open to women candidates only.

=== PG - Science Courses ===
M.Sc. Computer Science, M.Sc. Mathematics, M.Sc. Visual Communication, M.Sc. Foods & Nutrition, M.Sc. Textiles & Clothing, MCA, M.Sc. Biotechnology, M.Sc. Botany, M.Sc. Chemistry, M.Sc. Physics(Specialization in Astro Physics/Material Science), M.Sc. Guidance and Counseling, M.Lib.I.Sc.

=== PG - Arts Courses ===
MBA (Tourism), M.Com., M.A. Tamil Studies, M.A. English, M.A. Historical Studies, M.A. Mass Communication and Journalism, M.A. Sociology, Master of Social Work, M.A Women's Studies, MBA, M.A. Public Administration.

=== Education ===
M.Ed., B.Ed(Special Education, M.Ed(Special Education)

=== 5 Years Integrated Programmes ===
M.Sc. Computer Science(Specialization in Data Science), M.Com., M.Sc. Biotechnology, M.A Sociology

=== B.Ed(Regular) ===
(Women's University College of Education, Kodaikanal)

=== PG Diploma Courses ===
Counselling, Women's Studies, IPR (Intellectual Property Rights), Human Rights Education, Entrepreneurship Development, Event Management, Computer Applications, Professional Ethics, Yoga for Human Excellence, Fuzzy Hyper Graphs, Gandhian Thought.

=== Mother Teresa Women's University-M.Phil Regular ===
English, Tamil Studies, Management, Mathematics, Computer Science, Women's Studies, Commerce, Textiles and Clothing, Foods and Nutrition, Chemistry, Sociology, Mass Communication, Guidance and Counselling, Tourism Management, Historical Studies, Biotechnology, Botany, Physics, Visual Communication, Education, Special Education.

=== Mother Teresa Women's University-M.Phil Part Time ===
English, Tamil Studies, Management, Economics, Mathematics, Computer Science, Women's Studies, Commerce, Textiles and Clothing, Foods and Nutrition, Chemistry, Sociology, Mass Communication, Tourism Management, History, Biotechnology, Botany, Physics, Visual Communication, Education, Special Education, Geography, Micro Biology, BioChemistry, Zoology

=== Affiliated Colleges-M.Phil Regular ===
English, Tamil Studies, Management, Economics, Mathematics, Computer Science, Zoology, Commerce, Chemistry, History, Physics, Geography, Biochemistry, Micro Biology

== Colleges ==
I Constituent College 1.Women's University College of Education, Kodaikanal

II Government Colleges 1. M.V.M Govt. Arts College for Women, Dindigul 2. Government Arts College for Women, Nilakottai 3. Government Arts & Science College for Women, Kodaikanal

III Autonomous Colleges 1.Jeyaraj Annapackiam College for Women, Periyakulam 2.Arulmigu Palaniandavar Arts College For Women, Palani

IV Self Financing Colleges 1. St. Antony's College of Arts and Science for Women, Dindigul 2. Nadar Saraswathi College of Arts and Science, Theni 3. Sri Adi Chunchanagiri Women's College, Cumbum 4. Sakthi College of Arts and Science for Women, Oddanchatram, Dindigul 5. Thiravium College of Arts & Science for Women, Periyakulam 6. Bon Secours Arts & Science College for Women, Dindigul

== See also ==
- Kodaikanal
- Education in India
- Literacy in India
- List of institutions of higher education in Tamil Nadu
