= Khalilur Rahman (Khulna politician) =

Bangladeshi politician

Member of Bangladesh Parliament
- In office 1979–1986

Personal details
- Party: Bangladesh Nationalist Party

Khalilur Rahman (Bengali: খলিলুর রহমান) is a Bangladesh Nationalist Party politician and a former member of parliament for Khulna-15.

== Career ==
Rahman was elected to parliament from Khulna-15 as a Bangladesh Nationalist Party candidate in 1979.
