= Khalil ur Rahman (politician) =

Indian politician

Mohammed Khaleelur Rahman
- Born: 4 January 1936; Hyderabad, Telangana, India
- Died: 11 January 2011 (aged 75); Hyderabad
- Education: Osmania University
- Occupation: Politician
- Years active: 52 in politics
- Organization: Indian National Congress
- Relatives: Shafeeq Ur Rahman (son)

Khaleeq Ur Rehman Khaleelur Rahman (4 January 1936 – 11 January 2011 ) was an Indian Member of the Rajya Sabha. He was one of the great thinker for the welfare of minorities in Hyderabad, and began his political career as a Telugu Desam Party party worker. He died at the age of 75. He is the key person to have provided services to pilgrims in Mecca at Nizam Rubad for Hyderabadis.
