= Syed Khalil-ur-Rehman =

Pakistani politician

Syed Khali-ur-Rehman خلیل الرحمان

Minister of State for Defence, Pakistan
- In office 19 August 1952 – 17 April 1953
- Premier: Khawaja Nazimuddin

Personal details
- Born: 1904 Dera Ghazi Khan, Punjab Province, British India
- Died: 14 April 1972 (aged 67–68) Lahore, Pakistan
- Party: Pakistan Muslim League

Syed Khalil-ur-Rehman, خلیل الرحمان, was the 1st Minister of State for Defence Pakistan during the premiership of Khawaja Nazimuddin. He was also a close companion of Mr. Muhammad Ali Jinnah and a senior member of Pakistan Muslim League.

== Early life and education ==
Syed Khalil-ur-Rehman was born to Syed Suleman Shah (old and respectable family of Arab Sirae, New Delhi) in 1904 in Dera Ghazi Khan. He was the only Brother of Five Sisters.

He was a very good student and a sportsman throughout his academic career. He passed his matriculation examination in 1921 from Mozang high School, Lahore and secured 1st position. He played very good Football and Cricket. He was the captain of both his school and college teams. His interest in sports is visible from the fact that he formed a sports club in Mozang and remained associated with it for some time. The club is credited for preparing and bringing few good sportsmen of the time to limelight including his nephew, Syed Naeem Yazdani, a player of international standard, who represented Pakistan hockey team in New Zealand and Ireland. His other nephews, Syed Salim Yazdani was an Olympic Player and Syed Shamim Yazdani received acclaim in various sports at provincial level.

Syed Khalil-ur-Rehman completed B.A. Honors from Government College, Lahore in 1926. In 1927, he left for England for higher studies to become a Barrister. While still in England in 1930, he learned the news of his mother’s illness and immediately flew back to his homeland and therefore could not complete the final year of his studies on account of his sudden departure.

== Political career ==
Syed Khalil-ur-Rehman is credited for introducing Maulvi Abdul Bari to politics. He was also a friend of prominent and the oldest Muslim League worker Malik Barkat Ali.

While he was studying in England, the famous ‘Round Table Conference’ was being held there. Mr. Muhammad Ali Jinnah (Quaid-e-Azam), Maulana Mohammad Ali Jouhar, Mahatma Gandhi and other prominent leaders of South Asia were also present on the occasion. Syed Khalil-ur-Rehman was very impressed with Maulana Mohammad Ali Jouhar. From there on, he became inclined towards politics. He met Maulana Mohammad Ali Jouhar many times and they became close friends. He participated actively in the All India Muslim League sessions held in Abbottabad in 1938. He was a member of the Pakistan Resolution Committee and organiser of the All India Muslim League session held at Minto Park (Minar-e-Pakistan, Lahore in April 1940, where the Pakistan Resolution was adopted.

Soon after the Session, he was selected as the General Secretary of Punjab Muslim League. He faced considerable opposition from his opponents and ill-wishers at the time but he remained dedicated to the party. His efforts and commitment was eventually noticed and recognised by the Quaid and the high command of the Muslim League. Henceforth, he was invited to the central party meetings chaired by Quaid and other senior members of the party.

He is considered as one of the pioneers of Muslim League in Punjab.

In the early 1950s, he was elected to the 1st constituent assembly of Pakistan and became Minister of State for Defence in Khawaja Nazimuddin's Government. Later in 1953, after the dismissal of the cabinet, he was sent to Burma as Pakistan’s Ambassador.

== Summary of important positions held during his political career ==
- Punjab Muslim League General Secretary 1940-1944 (succeeded by Mumtaz Daultana (Mian Mumtaz Muhammad Khan Daultana).
- 5th President of Punjab Muslim League.
- Secretary and member of the Pakistan Muslim League Central Parliamentary Board (1946).
- Member of All India Muslim League Council before partition.
- Member of the Pakistan Resolution Committee
- 1st Minister of State for Defence, Pakistan (Khawaja Nazimuddin’s cabinet)
- Ambassador of Pakistan to Burma

== Civil Service ==
He retired from politics when Martial Law was first imposed. In 1965, he was appointed as the General Manager in Lyallpur Cotton Mills, where he commanded respect from all quarters specially the workers. During his tenure, there was a mark increase in the Mills productivity.

On one occasion, he was asked by Mr. Muhammad Ali Jinnah to take charge as chief Minister of Punjab which he refused.

== Personal life ==
As per prevailing norms and custom, he had already been married when he left for England for further studies. Soon after his return from England, his wife died at a very young age, leaving behind 1 boy and 2 girls for him to take care of.

He remarried in 1953 to Sir Akbar Hydari’s (Sir Muhammad Akbar Nazar Ali Hydari) Grand Daughter.

Once the owner of famous Khalil Manzil, a private Mansion (Haveli) in Takia Sardar Shah, Mozang, Lahore and various other landed property, he gave away 26 Murabba / Square (1 Murabba=24/25 Acre) landed property in Raiwind, Lahore to the Government of Pakistan. Such was his love for the country.

== Last years ==
He spent his final days in 1 (Ren Basera), Poonch Road, Islamia Park, Mozang, Lahore. He died on 14 April 1972, leaving behind a widow, 2 daughters and 3 sons.
