= Kodaikanal =

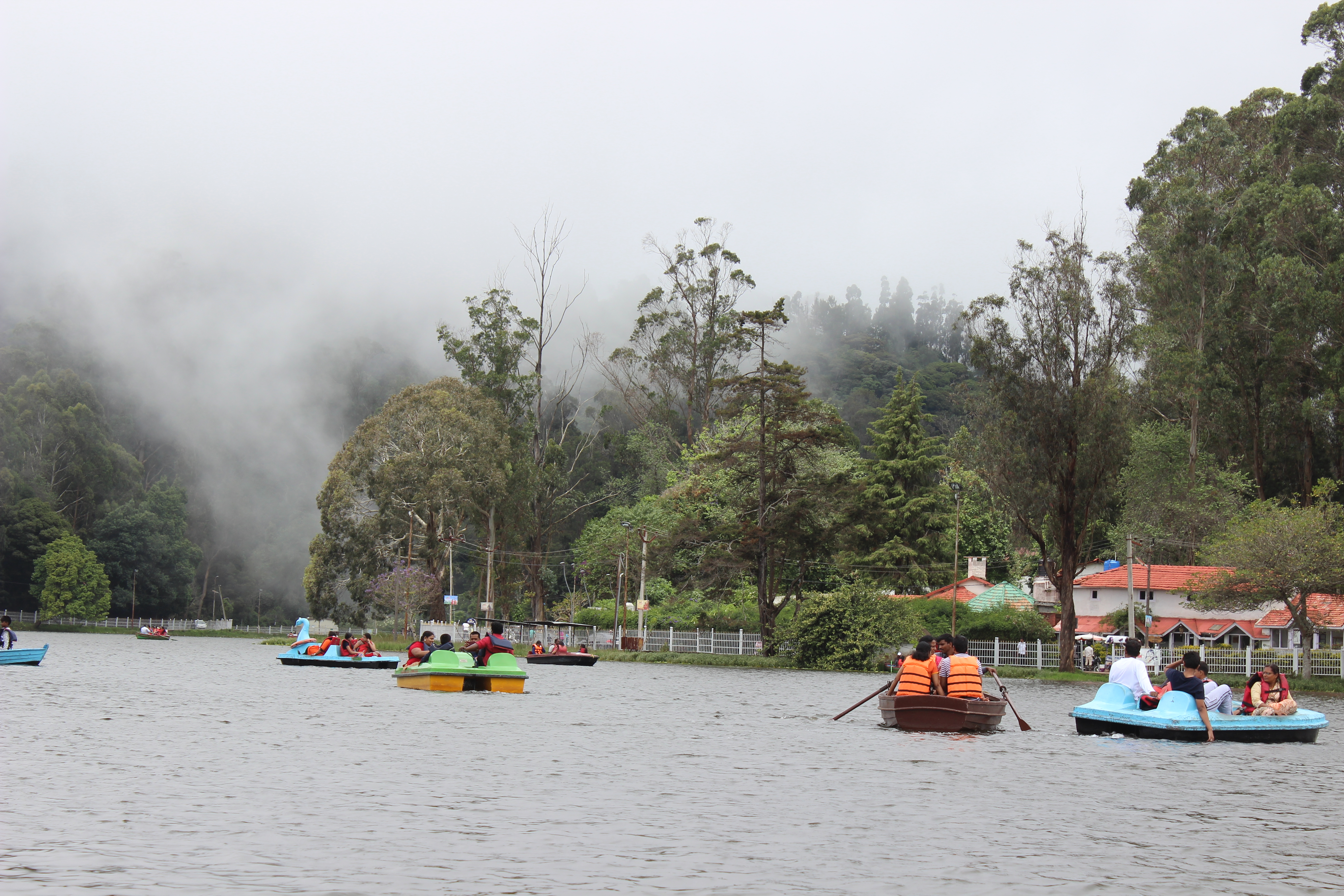
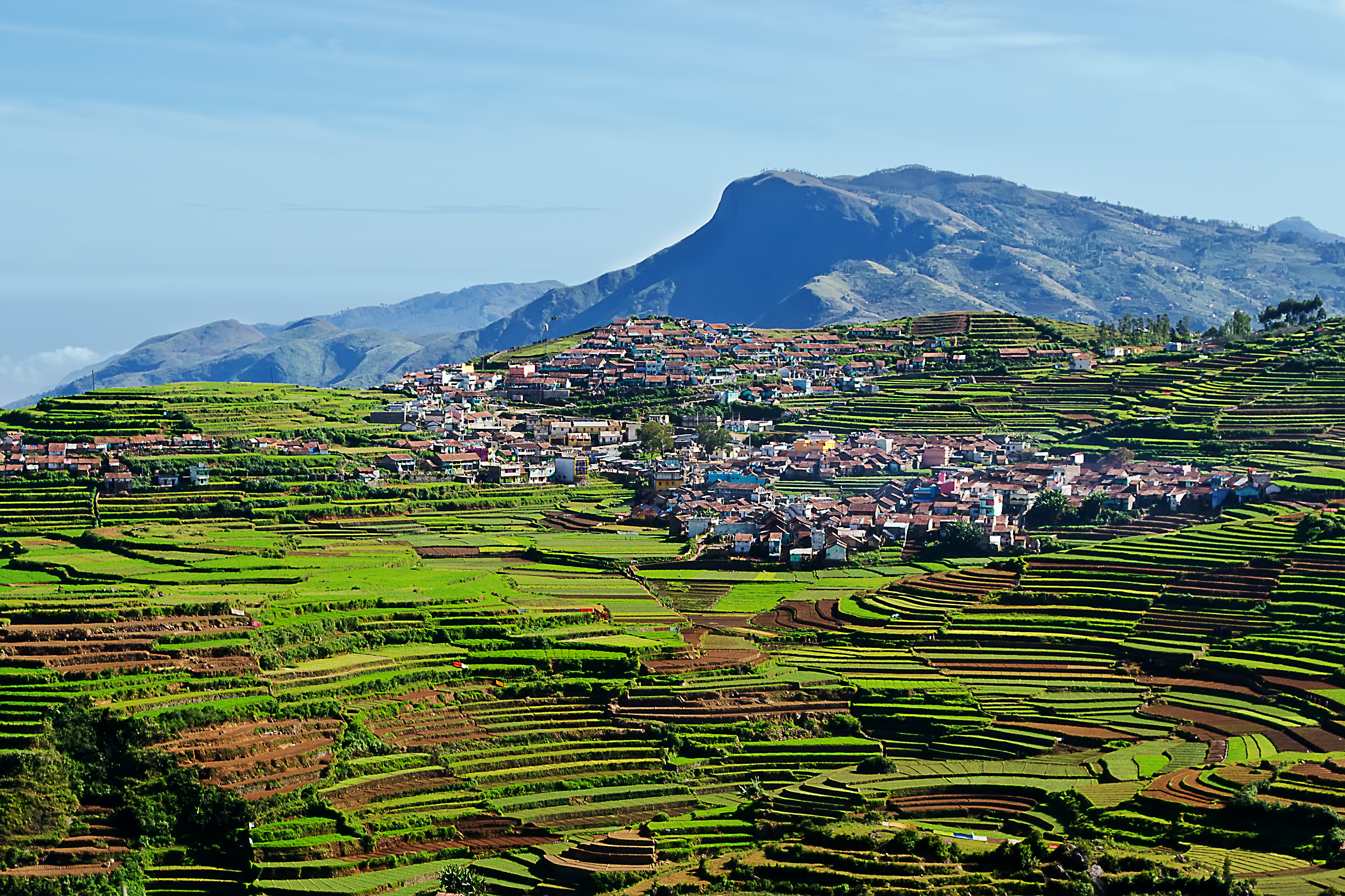
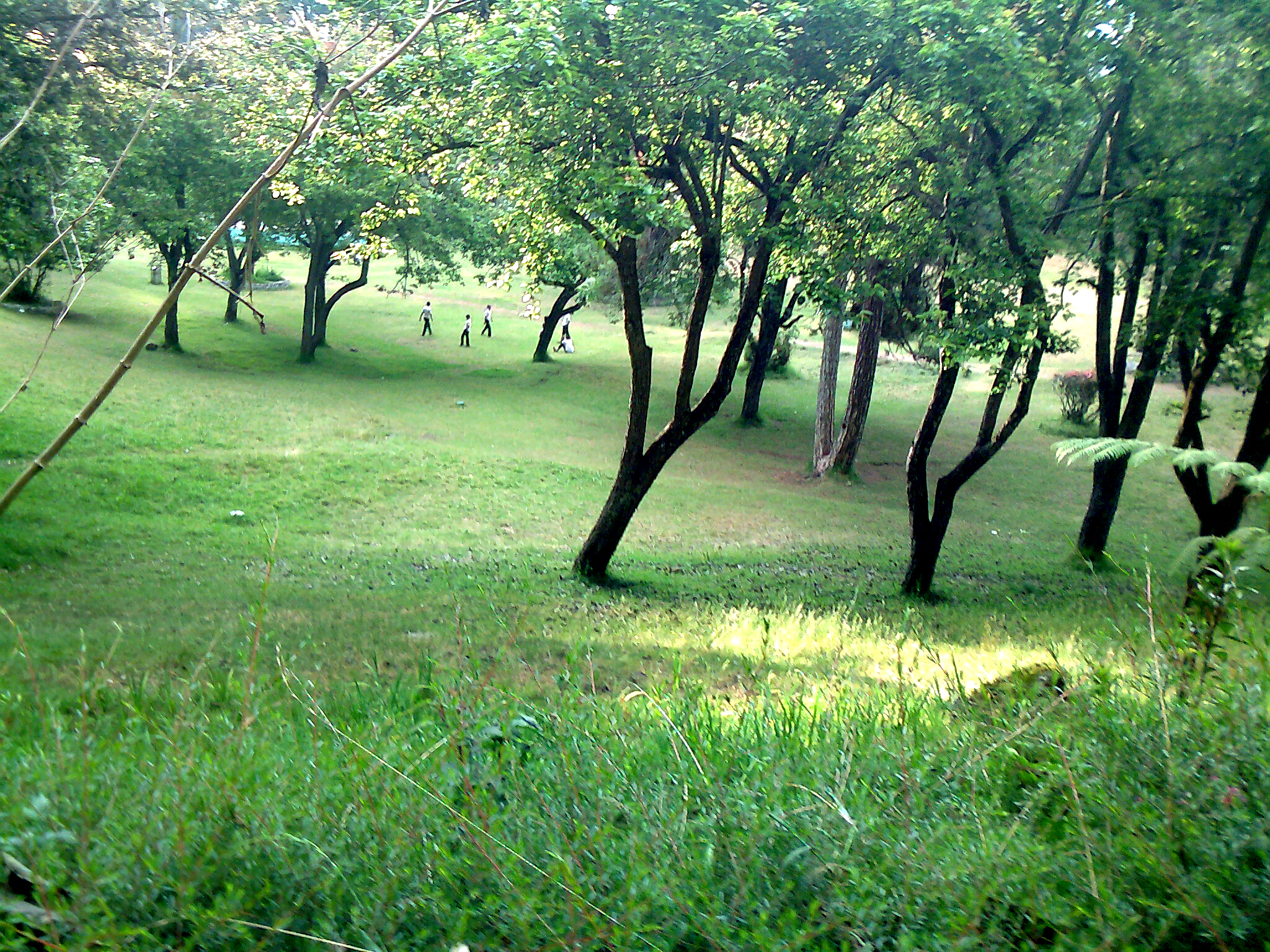
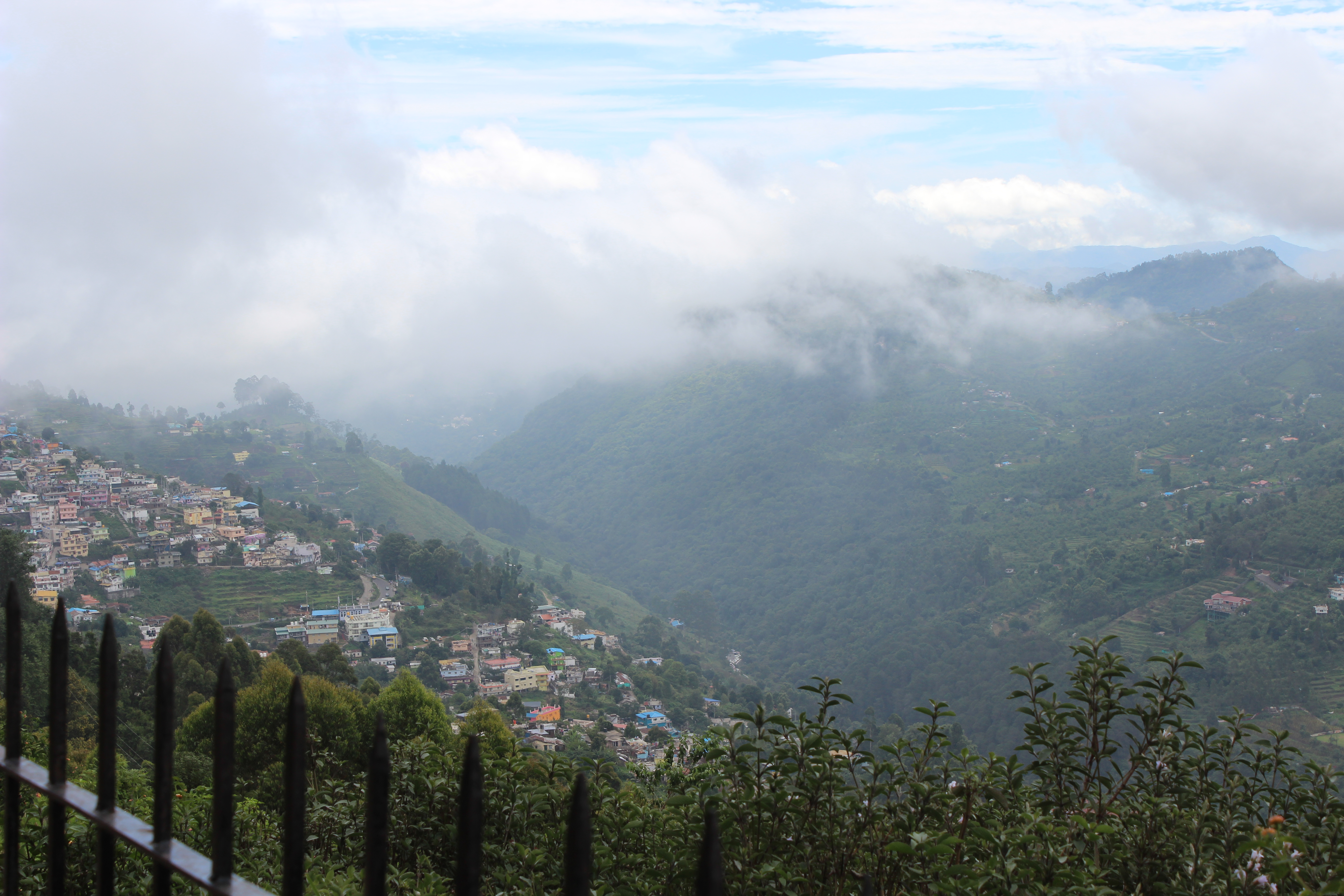
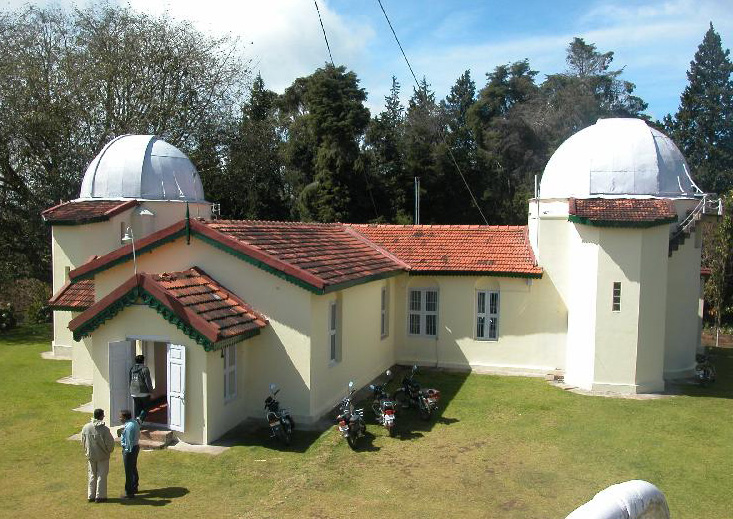
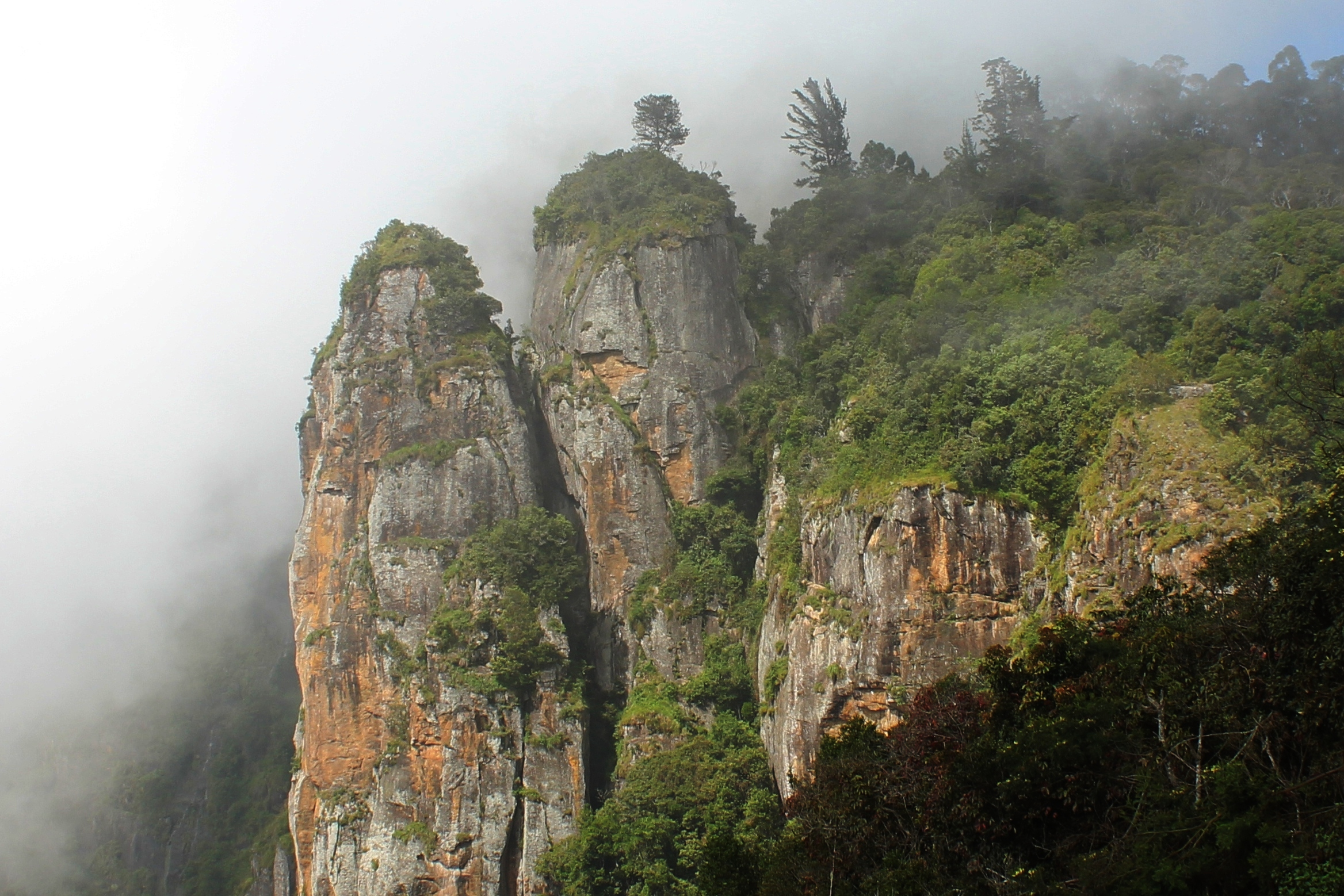
- Kodaikanal Lake Terrace farming Bryant Park Coaker's Walk Kodaikanal Solar Observatory Pillar Rocks
- Nickname: Princess of Hill Stations
- Location in Tamil Nadu, India
- Coordinates: 10.23°N 77.48°E
- Country: India
- State: Tamil Nadu
- District: Dindigul
- Taluk: Kodaikanal
- Established: 1845

Government
  - Type: Municipality
  - Body: Kodaikanal Municipality
  - Chairman: P. Chelladurai (DMK)

Area
  - Total: 21.45 km^{2} (8.28 sq mi)
- Elevation: 2,133 m (6,998 ft)

Population (2011)
  - Total: 36,501

Languages
  - Official: Tamil and English
- Time zone: UTC+5:30 (IST)
- PIN: 624101
- Telephone code: 04542
- Vehicle registration: TN-57, TN-94
- Precipitation: 1,650 mm (65 in)
- Sex ratio: M 51% F 49% ♂/♀
- Literacy: 89.5% (2011)
- Avg. summer temperature: 19.8 °C (67.6 °F)
- Avg. winter temperature: 8.3 °C (46.9 °F)
- Website: www.tnurbantree.tn.gov.in/kodaikanal/

Kodaikanal (ko-DYE-KAH-null, Tamil pronunciation: [ko'ɖaɪ'kaːnəl]) is a town and hill station in Dindigul district in the state of Tamil Nadu, India. It is situated at an altitude of 2,225 m (7,300 ft) in the Palani Hills of the Western Ghats. Kodaikanal was established in 1845 to serve as a refuge from the high temperatures and tropical diseases during the summer in the plains. It is a popular tourist destination and is referred to as the "Princess of Hill stations" with much of the local economy is based on the hospitality industry serving tourism. As per the 2011 census, the town had a population of 36,501.

== Etymology ==
The word Kodaikanal is an amalgamation of two Tamil language words: kodai meaning "gift" and kanal meaning "forest" translating to "gift of the forest".

== History ==
The earliest references to Kodaikanal and the Palani Hills are found in Tamil Sangam literature. Tamil composition Kuṟuntokai, the second book of the anthology Ettuthokai, mentions the mountainous geographic region (thinai) of Kurinji. The region is associated with Hindu god Murugan and is described as a forest with lakes, waterfalls and trees like teak, bamboo and sandalwood. The name of the region, Kurinji, derives from the name of the famous flower Kurinji found only in the hills and the occupants of the region were tribal people whose prime occupations were hunting, honey harvesting and millet cultivation. The hills were populated by the Palaiyar tribal people.

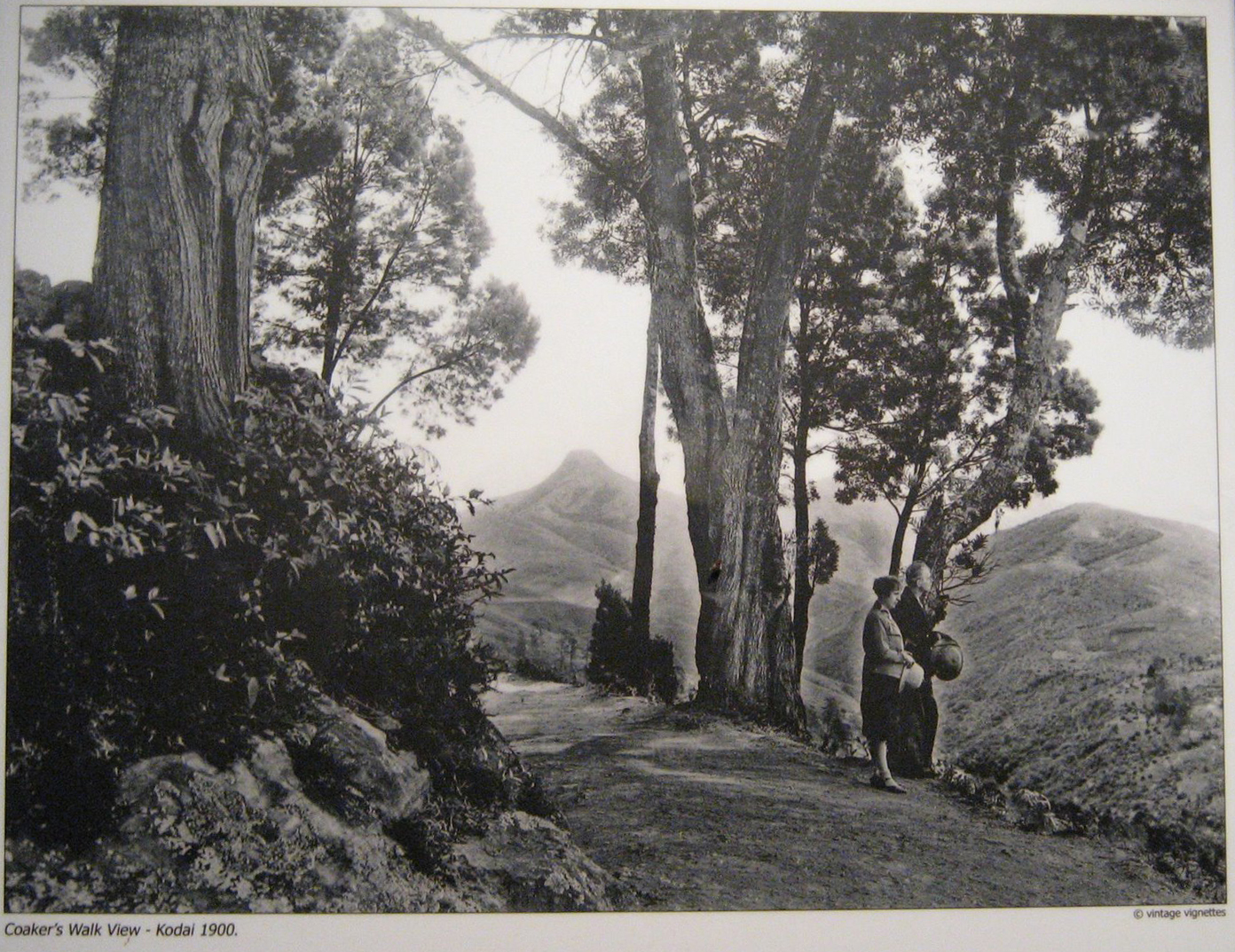
Coakers Walk in 1900

In 1821, a British Lieutenant, B. S. Ward, climbed up from his headquarters in the Kunnavan village to Kodaikanal to survey the area and reported of beautiful hills with a healthy climate with about 4,000 people living in well-structured villages. In 1834, J.C Wroughten, then revenue collector of Madura and C. R. Cotton, a member of the Madras Presidency's board of revenue, climbed up the hills from Devadanapatti. In 1836, botanist Robert Wight visited Kodaikanal and recorded his observations in the 1837 Madras Journal of Literature and Science. In 1852, Major J. M. Partridge of the Bombay Army built a house and was the person to settle there. In 1853, only six to seven houses were there when then Governor of Madras Presidency Charles Trevelyan visited in 1860. In 1862, American missionary David Coit Scudder arrived. In 1863, acting on a suggestion of Vere Levinge, then collector of Madurai, an artificial lake was formed.

In 1867, Major J. M. Partridge imported Australian eucalyptus and wattle trees and in 1872, Lt. Coaker cut a path along the steep south east facing ridge which overlooks the plains below and prepared a descriptive map the region. In the later half of the 19th century, it became a regular summer retreat for American missionaries and other European diplomats as a refuge from the high temperatures and tropical diseases of the plains. In 1901, the first observations commenced at the Kodaikanal Observatory. In 1909, the area had developed into a small town with 151 houses and a functioning post office, churches, clubs, schools and shops. In 1914, the ghat road was completed. It continued to serve as a summer retreat during the British Raj and became a popular hill station later.

== Geography ==
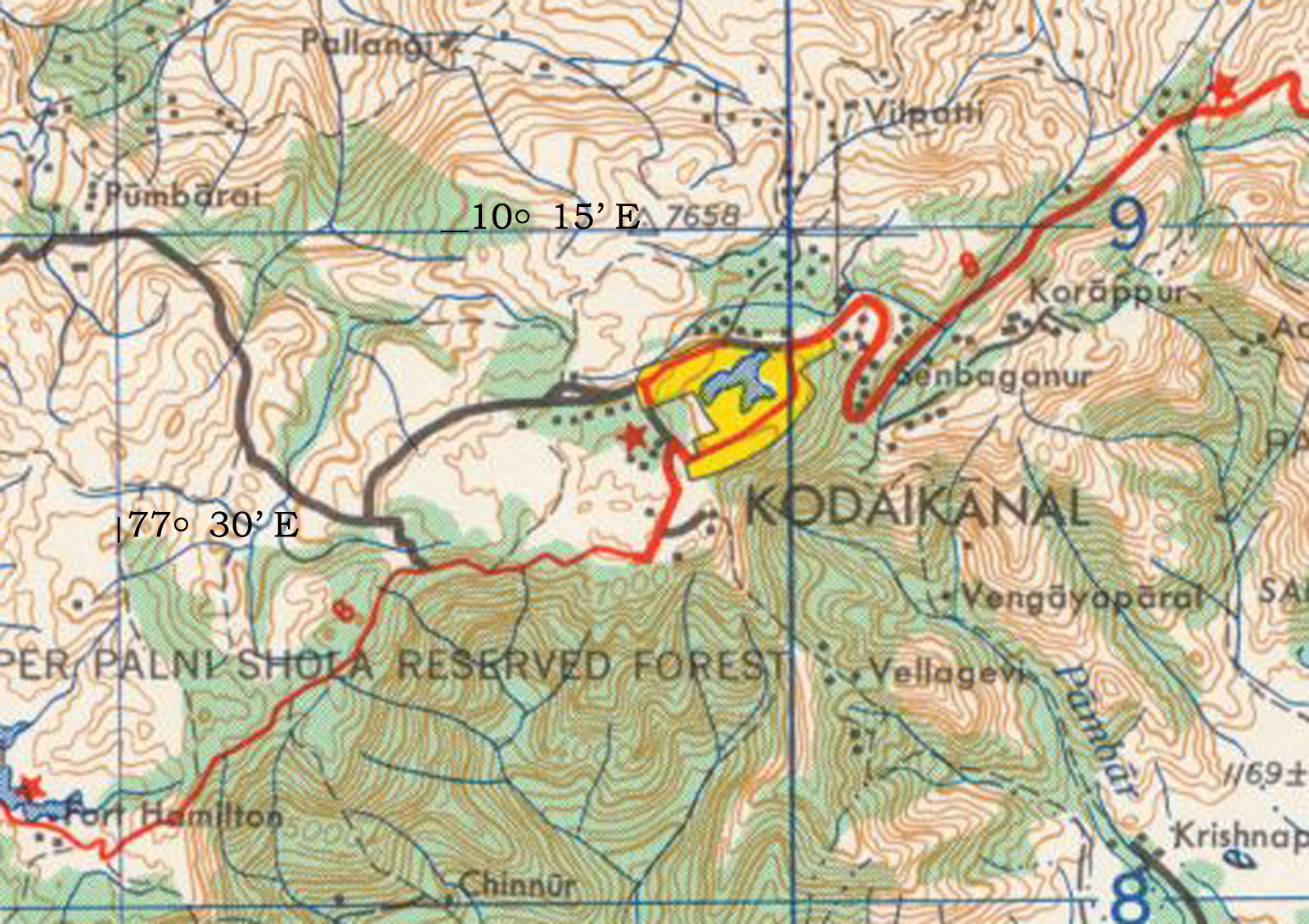
Topographic map (1955)

The town sits on a plateau above the southern escarpment of the upper Palani Hills at 2,225 metres (7,300 ft), between the Parappar and Gundar valleys. These hills form the eastward spur of the Western Ghats on the western side of South India. It has an irregular basin as its heartland, the center of which is now Kodaikanal Lake. The lake is a man-made lake of circumference 5 kilometres (3.1 mi), formed by blocking three water streams in 1863.

North of the town, high hills slope down into the villages and on the east, the hill slopes less abruptly into the lower Palani. A precipitous escarpment facing the Cumbum valley is on the south with a plateau leading to Manjampatti Valley in the Anamalai Hills in the west. There are many streams and waterfalls.

=== Flora and fauna ===
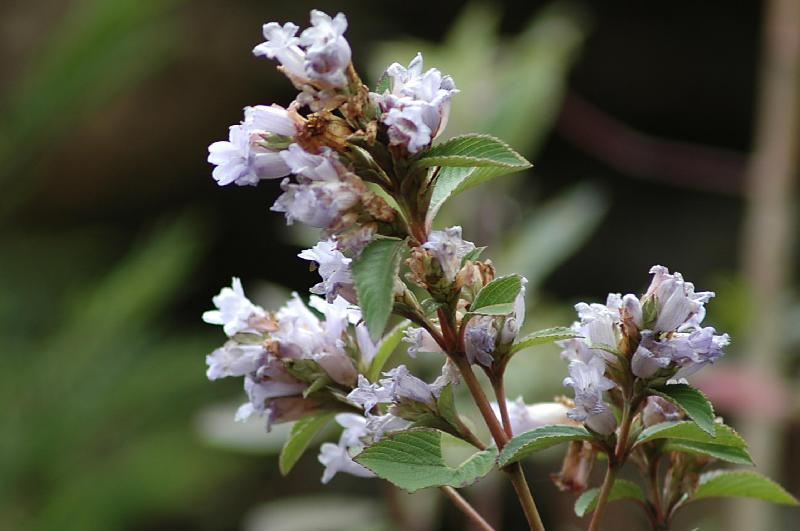
Native vegetation includes Kurinji flower that blooms once in 12 years.

In 1836, botanist Robert Wight visited Kodaikanal and recorded over 100 plant specimens. In 1861, Douglas Hamilton recorded 114 species of birds in Kodaikanal. In 1867, W T Blanford described a new species Callene albiventris of White-bellied blue robin, obtained by Samuel Fairbank from the Palani Hills. The native vegetation consisted of Meadows and grasslands on the hillsides with shola forests in the valleys. When the British established the town, big invasive species of pine, wattle and eucalyptus were planted and they became the dominant species replacing the native shola forests. There are numerous pear trees with flowering rhododendron and magnolia trees. Kurinji flower that blooms only once in 12 years is unique to the town.

Nilgiri Tahrs were reported in the open grasslands in the region in the 19th century. Other major fauna include Indian elephant, Indian gaur and Flying squirrel. There are many species of butterflies also found in the region. After multiple proposals over the years, the Kodaikanal Wildlife Sanctuary was notified by the Government of Tamil Nadu in 2013 and covers over 700 km^{2} (270 sq mi). The lake has various introduced fishes.

=== Climate ===
Kodaikanal has a monsoon-influenced subtropical highland climate (Cwb, according to the Köppen climate classification, bordering on Cfb). The temperatures remain cool throughout the year due to the high elevation.

Climate data for Kodaikanal (1991–2020, extremes 1901–2020)
| Month | Jan | Feb | Mar | Apr | May | Jun | Jul | Aug | Sep | Oct | Nov | Dec | Year |
|---|---|---|---|---|---|---|---|---|---|---|---|---|---|
| Record high °C (°F) | 25.4 (77.7) | 24.7 (76.5) | 26.7 (80.1) | 26.1 (79.0) | 27.8 (82.0) | 25.1 (77.2) | 23.9 (75.0) | 22.9 (73.2) | 22.8 (73.0) | 22.7 (72.9) | 23.4 (74.1) | 24.5 (76.1) | 27.8 (82.0) |
| Mean daily maximum °C (°F) | 18.6 (65.5) | 19.4 (66.9) | 20.8 (69.4) | 21.0 (69.8) | 21.2 (70.2) | 19.4 (66.9) | 18.1 (64.6) | 18.2 (64.8) | 18.6 (65.5) | 17.9 (64.2) | 16.9 (62.4) | 17.4 (63.3) | 19.0 (66.2) |
| Mean daily minimum °C (°F) | 8.8 (47.8) | 9.1 (48.4) | 10.7 (51.3) | 12.1 (53.8) | 13.0 (55.4) | 12.4 (54.3) | 11.9 (53.4) | 11.8 (53.2) | 11.7 (53.1) | 11.2 (52.2) | 10.3 (50.5) | 9.4 (48.9) | 11.0 (51.8) |
| Record low °C (°F) | 2.7 (36.9) | 3.8 (38.8) | 4.4 (39.9) | 6.1 (43.0) | 7.8 (46.0) | 5.0 (41.0) | 8.6 (47.5) | 8.3 (46.9) | 8.3 (46.9) | 5.6 (42.1) | 3.9 (39.0) | 2.8 (37.0) | 2.7 (36.9) |
| Average rainfall mm (inches) | 22.0 (0.87) | 37.2 (1.46) | 49.0 (1.93) | 122.5 (4.82) | 144.1 (5.67) | 89.1 (3.51) | 101.9 (4.01) | 156.1 (6.15) | 199.8 (7.87) | 269.6 (10.61) | 259.9 (10.23) | 127.6 (5.02) | 1,578.7 (62.15) |
| Average rainy days | 1.6 | 1.6 | 3.5 | 7.6 | 9.2 | 8.7 | 8.2 | 9.8 | 11.3 | 14.0 | 11.2 | 6.1 | 92.8 |
| Average relative humidity (%) (at 17:30 IST) | 74 | 72 | 69 | 79 | 84 | 87 | 88 | 88 | 88 | 89 | 88 | 80 | 82 |
| Mean monthly sunshine hours | 248.0 | 220.4 | 235.6 | 210.0 | 192.2 | 117.0 | 99.2 | 114.7 | 114.0 | 124.0 | 132.0 | 158.1 | 1,965.2 |
| Mean daily sunshine hours | 8.0 | 7.8 | 7.6 | 7.0 | 6.2 | 3.9 | 3.2 | 3.7 | 3.8 | 4.0 | 4.4 | 5.1 | 5.4 |
Source: India Meteorological Department (sun 1971–2000)

== Demographics ==
According to the 2011 census, Kodaikanal had a population of 36,501 with a sex-ratio of 1,004 females for every 1,000 males, much above the national average of 929. A total of 3,893 were under the age of six, constituting 1,945 males and 1,948 females. Scheduled Castes and Scheduled Tribes accounted for 19.86% and .28% of the population respectively. The average literacy of the city was 79.78%, compared to the national average of 72.99%. The town had a total of 9,442 households. There were a total of 14,103 workers, comprising 163 cultivators, 744 main agricultural labourers, 130 in household industries, 12,118 other workers, 948 marginal workers, 10 marginal cultivators, 51 marginal agricultural labourers, 34 marginal workers in household industries and 853 other marginal workers. As per the religious census of 2011, Kodaikanal had 48.8% Hindus, 12% Muslims, 38.7% Christians, 0.5% following other religions or did not indicate any religious preference.

== Economy ==
The economy of Kodaikanal predominantly depends on tourism with about 3.2 million tourists visiting in 2009. Changes are made every year in the summer in preparation for the peak tourist season with major roads converted into one-way lanes to regulate the constant inflow of traffic and special police are brought in for the safety of the tourists and protection of local businesses. Plums, pears, peppers, carrots, cauliflower, cabbage, garlic and onions are cultivated by terrace farmers in surrounding villages and are trucked to the market.

== Administration ==
Kodaikanal is administered by the Kodaikanal municipality, established in 1899. It became a Grade Two municipality in 1960, upgraded to first grade in the year 1975 and Selection Grade in 1983. It is a Special Grade Municipality with effect from 31 May 1994. The Municipal Council has 24 wards. There is a government run hospital and a few private centers, which are not equipped for complicated diagnoses and surgery.

== Transportation ==
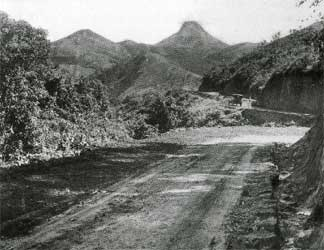
Ghat road in the early 1900s

Early travelers traveled 50 kilometers (31 mi) by bullock cart and then the last 18 kilometers (11 mi) journey to Kodaikanal was undertaken by foot, horse, or palanquins with hired coolies. In 1854, an improved 16 kilometers (9.9 mi) bridle path was built and was extended up to Kodaikanal in 1878. Engineer Major G. C. Law was deputed to study and submit a plan to build a motor-able road to the hills and the road was finally completed in 1914 and opened for public traffic in 1916. The road is currently designated as SH-156 with a length of 52.4 kilometers (32.6 mi) and starts at the intersection with Grand Southern Trunk Road (NH-45), about 8 kilometers (5.0 mi) west of Batlagundu. Also, during World War II, the Kodaikanal–Munnar Road, an evacuation road from Kodaikanal along the hillcrest to Top Station and Munnar was built, which was abandoned in 1990. The two main road routes to reach Kodaikanal are via Palani and Batlagundu. Bus services are operated by the state owned Tamil Nadu State Transport Corporation (TNSTC).

In 1875, the Indian Railways extended its line from Chennai to Tirunelveli and a train station named Kodaikanal Road to facilitate visits to Kodaikanal. The nearest railway stations are Palani (64 kilometres or 40 miles) and Kodaikanal Road (80 kilometres or 50 miles). The nearest major rail-head is Madurai Junction (114 kilometres or 71 miles) in the east. The Kodaikanal-Gudalur Railway line was under the contemplation from 1889 with the first survey in 1897 and several surveys till 1920. In 1922, the district board of Madurai initiated the Government to cancel the sanction of the railway line. The nearest airports are Madurai International Airport (115 kilometres or 71 miles) and Coimbatore International Airport (170 kilometres or 110 miles) with regular flights from/to major domestic destinations and international destinations like Sharjah, Colombo and Singapore.

== Education ==
Kodaikanal comes under the Vaththalagundu educational district. The town has a government school and many private schools. There are a few colleges, major of which is the Kodaikanal Christian College and Mother Teresa Women's University.

== Tourism and recreation ==
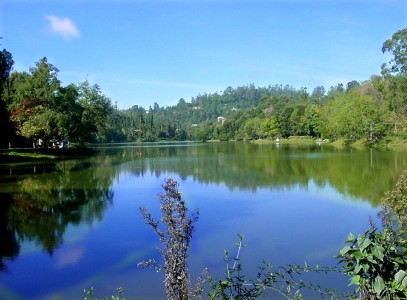
Kodaikanal Lake is one of the most popular geographic landmarks

Kodaikanal has several clubs and civil society organizations operating for social, charitable and environmental goals. Established clubs in Kodaikanal include Kodaikanal Boat Club (1890), Kodaikanal Golf Club (1895), Indian Club (1915), Kodaikanal Lions Club (1985) and Rotary Club. In 1890, the Kodaikanal Missionary Union (KMU) was formed to enable missionaries of various denominations to come together for recreation and in 1923 it built an Edwardian style clubhouse, which was handed over to Kodaikanal International School in the 1980s. Kodaikanal has several social service societies which promote local trade including the Kodaikanal People Development Group (KOPDEG), which has been successful in providing employment for marginalized women and marketing their products. The cottage crafts shop at Anna Salai is run by the voluntary organization, Coordinating Council for Social Concerns in Kodai (CORSOK) and the Potter's Shed, selling locally made pottery was established in 1994. Kodaikanal Lake Protection Council and Vattakkanal Organization for Youth, Community and Environment (VOYCE) are organizations involved in preserving Kodaikanal's environment.

There are many Hindu temples, mosques and churches. Kuzhanthai Velappar temple is believed to have been built three thousand years ago by the Cheras and consists of a Murugan idol made of Dashabashanam (10 metal alloys) believed to have been conscreated by Bhogar. Kurinji Andavar Temple which takes its name from the indigenous Kurinji flower that blooms once in 12 years at the location, was built in 1924 and is dedicated to Lord Murugan. La Saleth Church is a church dedicated to Virgin Mary, located near Coaker’s Walk.

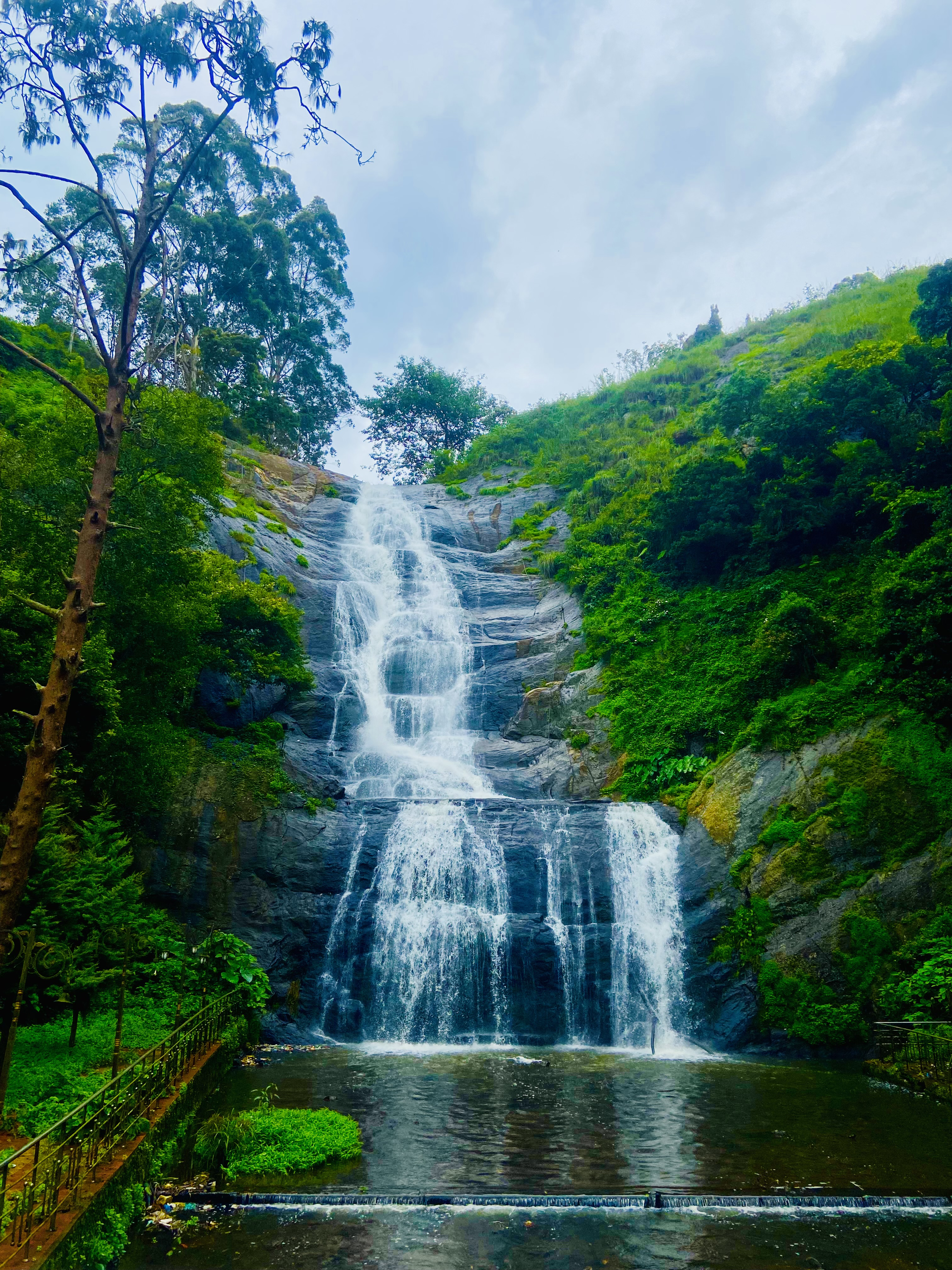
Silver Cascade waterfall

Kodaikanal Lake is an artificial, roughly star-shaped 45-hectare (110-acre) lake built in 1863 and is Kodaikanal's most popular geographic landmark and tourist attraction with rowboats and pedalos that can be hired at the Kodaikanal Boat Club. Berijam Lake is an artificial lake located 22 km (14 mi) from Kodaikanal. Bear Shola falls is a waterfall located about 3 km (1.9 mi) from Kodaikanal inside the forest with the water flow rate varying depending on the monsoons. Bryant Park is a landscaped park on the eastern side of Kodaikanal Lake, is named after the British officer who founded it and hosts an annual flower show in May. Coaker's Walk is a 1 km (0.62 mi) walkway constructed by Lt. Coaker in 1872 running along the edge of slopes on the south from which there is an unhindered view of the valley and plains below. Dolphin Nose is a viewpoint that offers a panoramic view of the valley and can be reached by a 3 km (1.9 mi) trek on an unguarded narrow path.

Green valley view is located 5 km (3.1 mi) from the Kodaikanal lake and offers a view of the Vaigai dam located below. In 1906, with a view to growing valuable timber, H.D. Bryant started the Kodaikanal pine plantations in the south-west of Kodaikanal and the Pine forests have become a tourist attraction. Pillar rocks are two 122 m (400 ft) high rock-formations situated 7 km (4.3 mi) from the Kodaikanal lake. Shenbaganur museum is located 5 km (3.1 mi) from the Kodaikanal lake and has an orchidarium along with an archaeological museum. Silver Cascade is a 100 ft (30 m) waterfall formed by the overflowing waters of the Kodaikanal lake, located 8 km (5.0 mi) ahead of town. Located on the outskirts of Kodaikanal, Guna caves, made popular by the Tamil movie Gunaa and previously called Devil's Kitchen, are deep bat-infested chambers between the gigantic boulders that are the pillar rocks.

Kodaikanal Solar Observatory, 6 kilometres (3.7 mi) from the bus-stand on Observatory Road, at 2,343 metres (7,687 ft) is the highest location near Kodaikanal. The first observations were commenced here in 1901. Former Director John Evershed discovered the phenomenon of radial motion in sunspots, now known as the Evershed effect. The Kodaikanal Terrestrial Telescope can view a grand panorama including Sothupparai Dam, Vaigai Dam, Periyakulam and Varaha river. This Indian Institute of Astrophysics facility has a comprehensive astronomical science museum with organized public tours, access to the astronomy library, and scheduled night-time telescopic sky viewing.

== Environmental pollution ==
In 1983, a second-hand mercury thermometer factory was relocated from New York to Kodaikanal. The factory, owned by Unilever, was shut down in 2001 over allegations of mercury contamination and serious environmental violations. By the time the factory was closed, air and water-borne mercury emissions had already contaminated large areas of the town including the Kodaikanal Lake and the surrounding forests. The dispersed contaminants are projected to remain in the soil for centuries. A committee was appointed by the ministry of labour in 2011 to investigate the issue. The committee estimated that about 11.2 tonnes of mercury could have been dispersed into the air and disposed as waste from the thermometer factory.

Initially, Unilever denied dumping the wastes, denied compensation for the workers affected by the mercury poisoning and refused to take up the responsibility of cleaning up the contaminated soil. After years of legal proceedings in the Madras High Court, Unilever agreed to compensate the workers in 2016. Site remediation studies were undertaken by various national bodies to assess the clean-up that required to be done. Following an order of the Supreme Court and the National Green Tribunal in 2018, Unilever was asked to carry out site remediation work. The company began removing the hazardous materials in 2021. Several complaints were raised by the locals and non-governmental organizations that the company was flouting procedural norms, while Unilever denied these allegations.

The state government has banned the usage of plastic bags due to the pollution caused by them to the fragile ecosystem.

== In popular culture ==
Kodaikanal has been the location for many movie shootings including Darling, Darling, Darling (1982), Welcome to Kodaikanal (1992). Guna (1991), Manjummel Boys and Rasavathi (2024)
