= Fashion entrepreneur =

A fashion entrepreneur is a person who has possession of a fashion enterprise, venture or idea, and assumes significant accountability for the inherent risks and outcome.

== Definition ==
Originating from the term entrepreneur, a fashion entrepreneur is someone whose primary activities revolve around the fashion industry.

For example, a fashion designer who uses entrepreneurial principles to organize, create, and manage ventures within related and connected areas of the fashion industry. Fashion ventures include guide books for fashion designers

== Current practice ==
Fashion entrepreneurs focus on building networks within the industry and developing interconnected projects with diverse goals, such as education, profit, and raising their profile. Some aim to create platforms for sharing knowledge, while others work to address social and structural challenges within the fashion world.

Core business practices for fashion entrepreneurs focus on topics such as creativity and innovation, writing business plans, raising finance, sales and marketing, and the small business management skills needed to run a creative company. Fashion entrepreneurs seek to deliver fashion business expertise in retail, manufacturing, money and marketing. The 21st century has seen the proliferation of organizations and award ceremonies promoting, inspiring and challenging online entrepreneurship by highlighting the enterprising attributes, creativity, innovation and the success of today's entrepreneurs.
