= Kodaikanal–Munnar Road =

Road in Tamil Nadu and Kerala, India

Route information
- Length: 81 km (50 mi)
- Existed: 1925–1990

Major junctions
- West end: Munnar
- East end: Kodaikanal

Location
- Country: India
- States: Tamil Nadu, Kerala

Highway system
- Roads in India; Expressways; National; State; Asian

The Kodaikanal–Munnar Road (old SH-18) was located in Dindigul District of Tamil Nadu and Idukki district of Kerala in South India. It covers 81 kilometers (50 mi) from Kodaikanal to Munnar. The road was improved by the British in 1942 as an evacuation route in preparation for a possible Japanese invasion of South India. With a maximum elevation of 2,480 meters (8,140 ft) just south of Vandaravu Peak, it was among the highest roads in India, south of the Himalayas, prior to its closure in 1990.

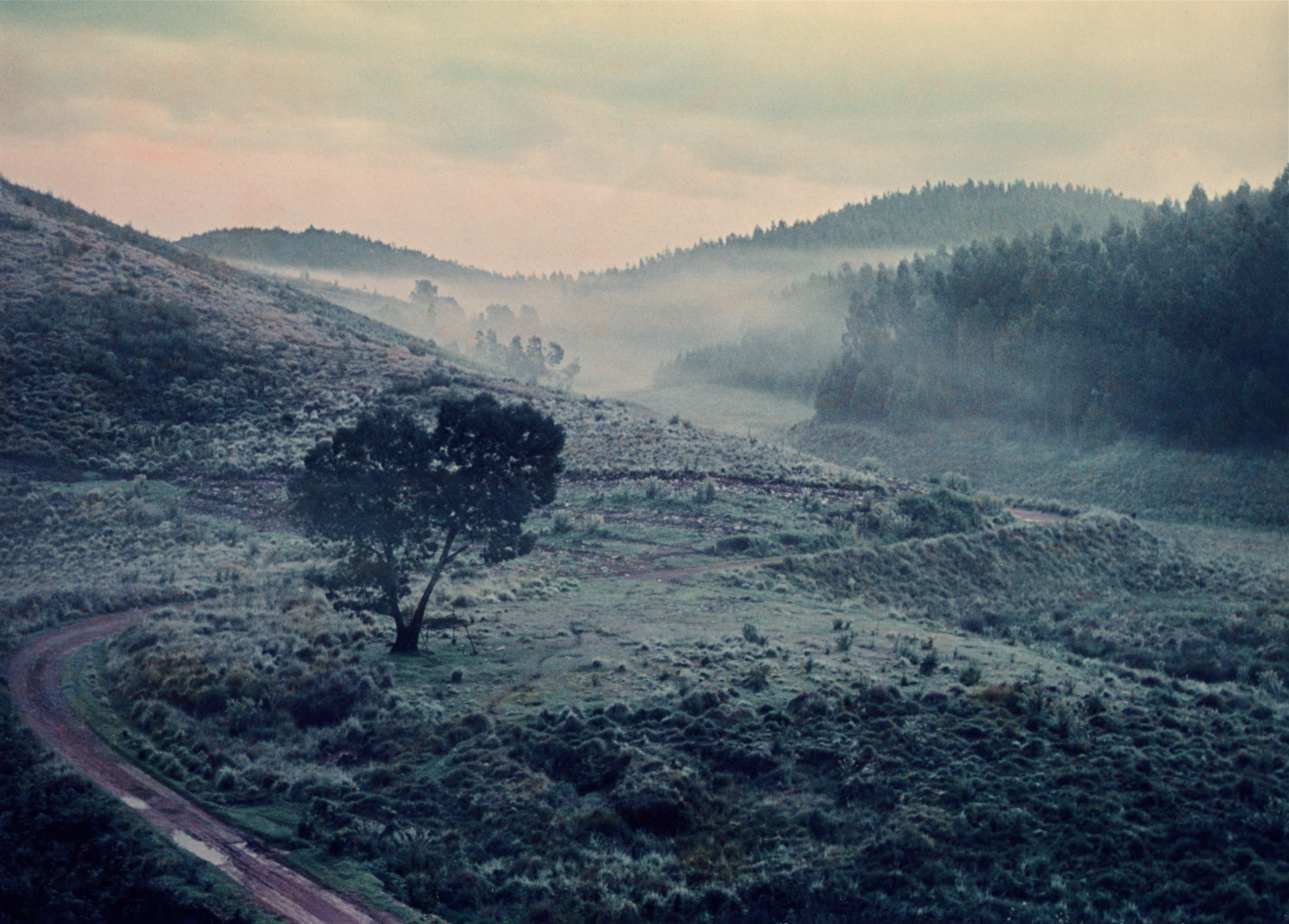
Kodaikanal - Munnar road, 1981 before encroachment of plantation forest

== History ==
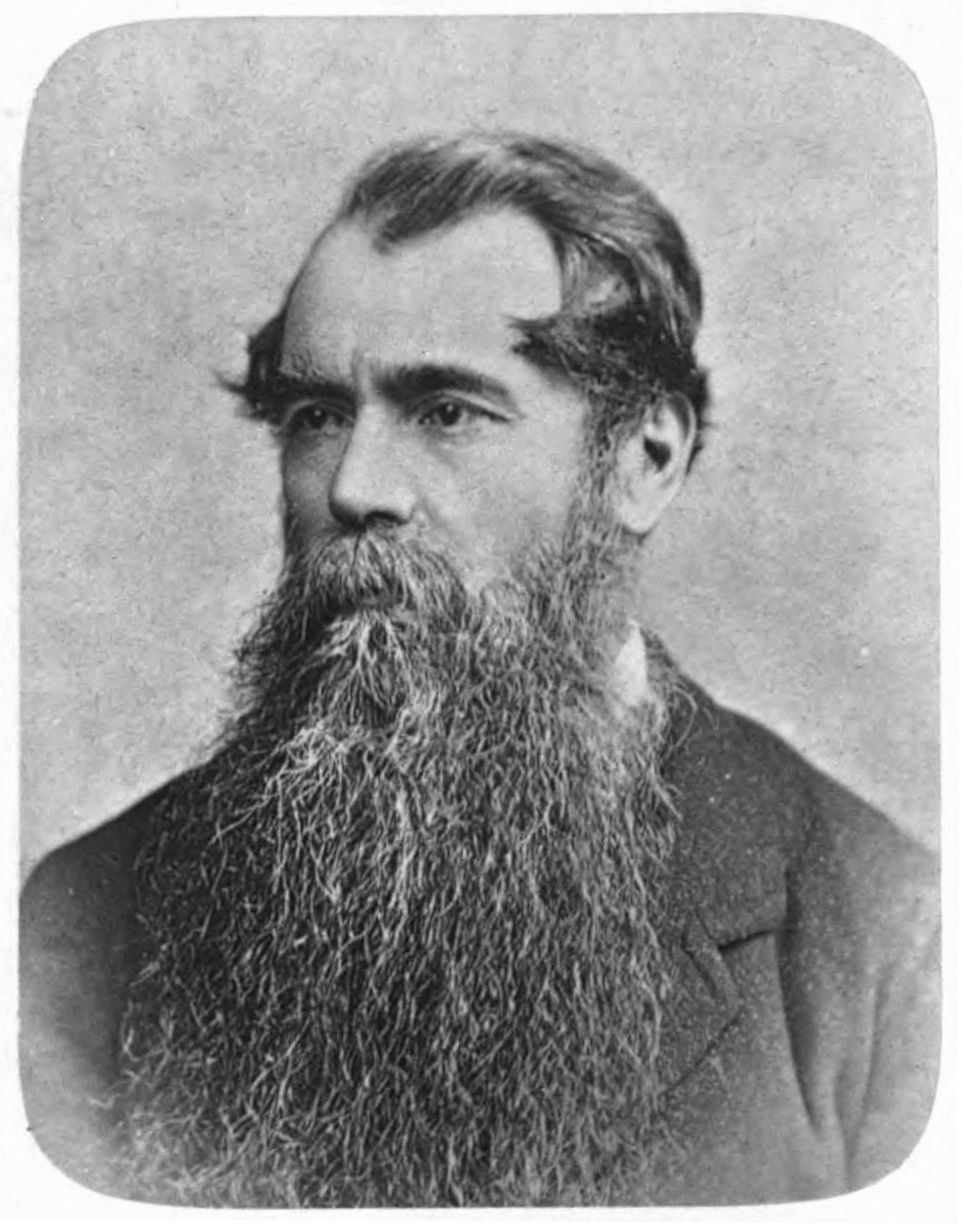
Douglas Hamilton, 1870, age 52

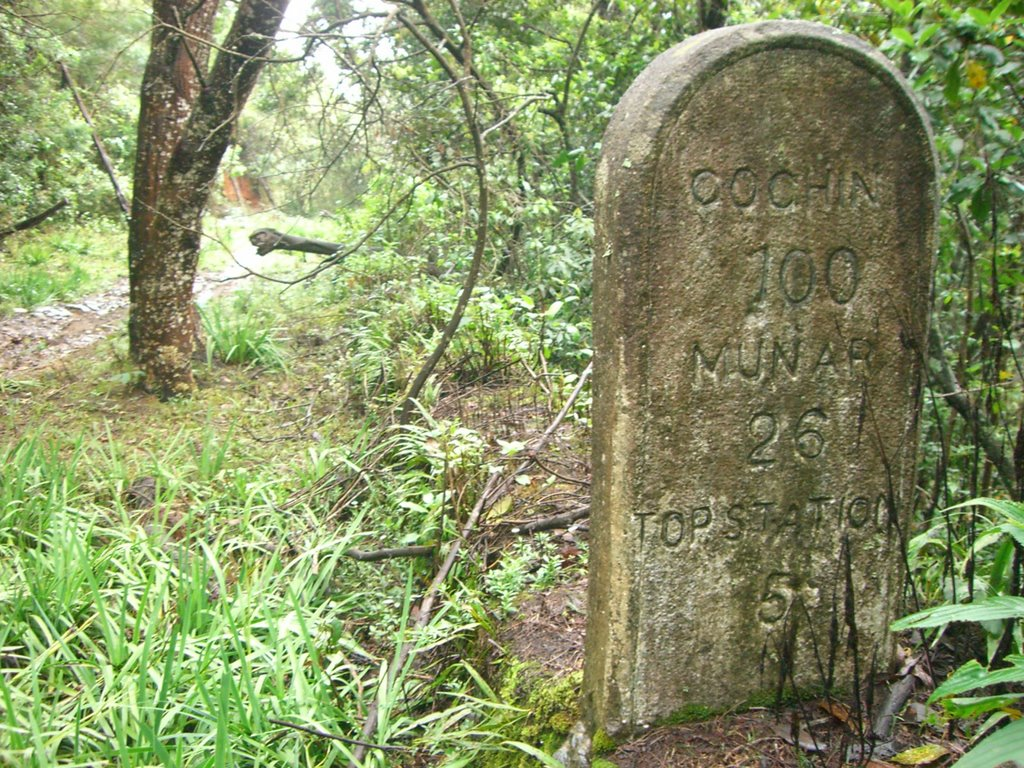
Original milestone on wall beside road. Tree in road, 2008

In 1864 Douglas Hamilton submitted a report stating that the Berijam Swamp area was the best site in the Palani Hills for a military cantonment or sanatorium. "Let but the lake be reconstructed and a road made to it, and this magnificent sheet of water . . . will of itself attract residents to its vicinity. "The Fort Hamilton military outpost, later built there, was named for him.

In 1900 the Kundale Road and Tramway between Munnar and Top Station was completed by the Kanan Devan Hills Produce Company. The 35 kilometers (22 mi) road runs down the valley of the Kundale River. The road was built 4.6 meters (15 ft) wide of which 3.7 meters (12 ft) was metaled. The sharpest curve was 20 meters (66 ft) and the steepest gradient was 1 in 30. There were 22 timber bridges between 7.6 meters (25 ft) and 20 meters (66 ft) span. By 1905 the timber bridges were being replaced by steel and concrete structures.

In 1915, Law's Ghat road, opened Kodaikanal to cars, trucks, and buses coming from Batlagundu. In 1925, a second ghat road was started from Berijam Lake to Top Station, connecting with Munner, Kerala and eventually Cochin, a total distance of 257 kilometers (160 mi). This was an extraordinarily slow dirt road, taking about eleven hours to reach Cochin. The road was impassable during and after heavy rains.

In 1942, during World War II, Madras City was bombed by the Japanese but the physical damage was negligible, though the public response was major and the city was evacuated because of fears of subsequent Japanese bombing and invasion. Many rich families from Madras moved permanently to the hill stations in fear, while poor people were evacuated to both nearby and far-flung villages that lay along the railways. In 1942 in preparation for a possible Japanese invasion of India, the British began improvements to the road to facilitate its use as an evacuation route from Berijam Lake (Fort Hamilton) near Kodaikanal along the southern crest of the Palani Hills to Top Station. It was then called "The Escape Road". Existing roads then continued to Munnar and down to Cochin where ships would be available for evacuation out of India.

A far more probable reason for building this road was to secure the "top station" of a Munnar tea exporting rope-way (at Top Station, then in Madras Presidency) by providing a motorable route from Madras Presidency.

The road was operative till 1990 but was ignored by both the Tamil Nadu Forest Department and the Kerala Highways Department in a dispute over its inter-state ownership. The old road is now in disrepair and overgrown with vegetation in some places. It is used as a logging trail and as a walking trail by local villagers and trekkers. Encounters with wild animals including bison, elephants, Leeches and leopards sometimes occur on the trail.

== Old route ==
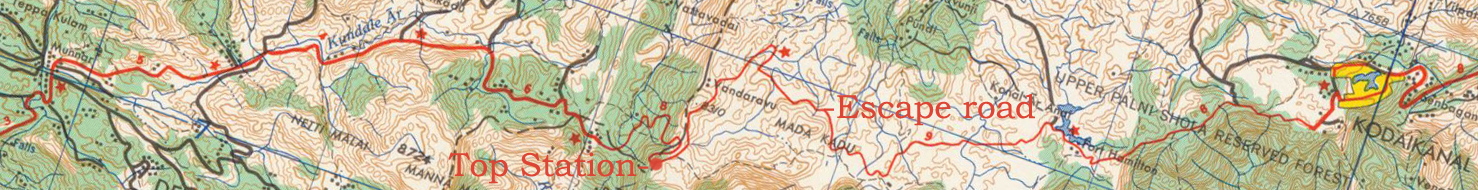
Kodaikanal-Munnar road, 1959, (legend: green= forest, tan= grassland) Central location: 10°8′56″N 77°17′8″E (view coordinates in this article on Wikimapia / Satellite / Street for more details)

The road begins as Club Road at 2,100 meters (6,900 ft) elevation on the bund at Kodaikanal Lake, climbing west as Upper Shola road and forking left as Pillar Rocks road. It has very good dream Nelly the Green Valley View, (formerly called Suicide Point) at km 5.5, Kodaikanal Golf Club at km 6, Pillar Rocks Viewpoint at km 6.5

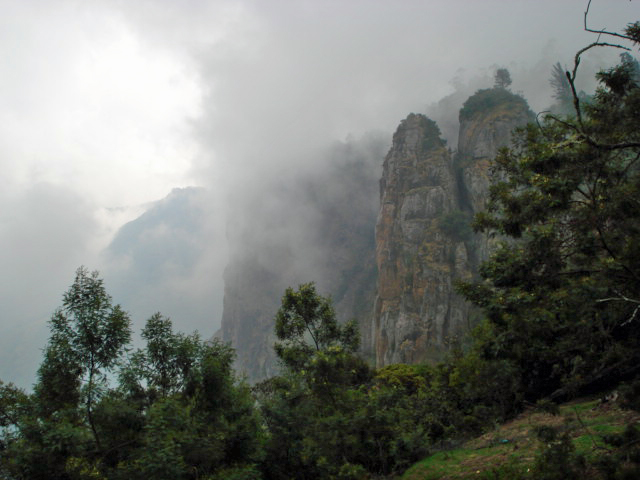
Pillar Rocks, Kodaikanal

and Moir Point at km 9.3. At this point of 2,310 meters (7,580 ft) elevation the road forks, with the left fork going towards Berijam, and Munnar. The right fork is the "Goschen Road" to the villages of Poombarai and Kukkal northwest of this place. Extensions to Mannavanur (junction), and Kavunji, together with a connecting road to Berijam Lake from near Kavunji, create a loop of about 40 mi (64 km) length, the "Forty Mile Round". In 1929, Sir Thomas Moir "turned the first sod", beginning construction of the "Goschen Road" which was completed in 1932. This event is memorialised with a monument at "Moir Point", located near to the junction of the roads to Berijam Lake, Poomparai and Kodaikanal.

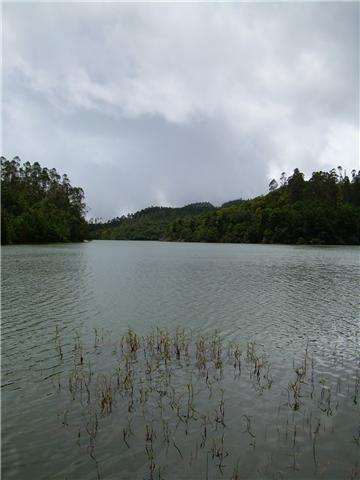
Berijam Lake

Just past this junction is a Forest Department checkpost, which controls entry into the Allinagaram Reserve forest through which the road passes west to Berijam Lake and beyond. This area is part of the proposed Palani Hills Wildlife Sanctuary and National Park. Beyond km marker 13 on the Berijam road there is a firewatching tower from where one may have a fine view of the secluded Berijam Lake and the surrounding forest. At km 21 at 2,180 meters (7,150 ft) elevation, Berijam has a Forest Department Camp including an Eco-Education Center for visitors. Nature areas to be visited here include: swamp ecosystem, fresh water ecosystem, nature trail, bridge, medicinal demonstration garden, museum, nature walk, grassland and shola. This camp also is the site of an old two-story brick building, partly damaged and blackened over the years, with a bright yellow painted name reading "Britisher's Transit Camp". This is one of several transit camps built during World War II for British soldiers to rest along the 230 km (143 mi) British "Escape Route" from Kodaikanal via Top Station and Munnar to Cochin. While most of the transit camps are now either dilapidated or demolished, the one at Berijam is still used as a Forest Rest house. At this point an old road, now just a trail, forks off to the north for 12 km (7.5 mi) down to Kavunji village at 1,975 metres (6,480 ft) elevation.

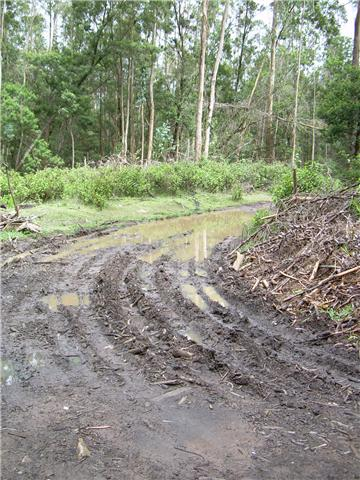
Tracks of logging trucks on Munnar Road near Palavachar Stream

West of Berijam Lake, the road is closed for public vehicles and not maintained. Though the road is heavily damaged and overgrown till the Kerala border, it is well maintained within Kerala past Top Station.

The road meanders southwest and passes south of Konalar Dam and reservoir at km 25. It then continues southwest and around the south side of a 2,320 meters (7,610 ft) hill at km 31, then northwest around 2,517 meters (8,258 ft) Ibex peak and through a shallow 2,390 meters (7,840 ft) pass at km 34. 1.5 km over a hill past a rest house, it passes down across a bridge over Kathirikkai Odei (the Second Trout Stream). There is a path from there up along the stream to a waterfall on the stream. The road then proceeds northwest, bridges the Pulavachiar river at km 39, makes a loop north and then passes south along the east side of Vandaravu Peak. The road crosses its highest point of 2,480 meters (8,140 ft) just south of Vandaravu Peak at km 50 where it crosses the Kerala state boundary and enters Pampadum Shola National Park.

The road then proceeds sharply down to the southwest through 17 hairpin turns to Top Station (Again Tamil Nadu) at elevation 1,930 meters (6,330 ft) at km 60. Here the road becomes Kerala SH-18 and is well maintained, passing by extensive tea plantations 31 kilometers (19 mi) to Munnar. There is public bus service between kodaikanal to kilavarai, vattavada to munnar, the distance between kilavarai and vattavada is 17 km no bus service

== Access ==
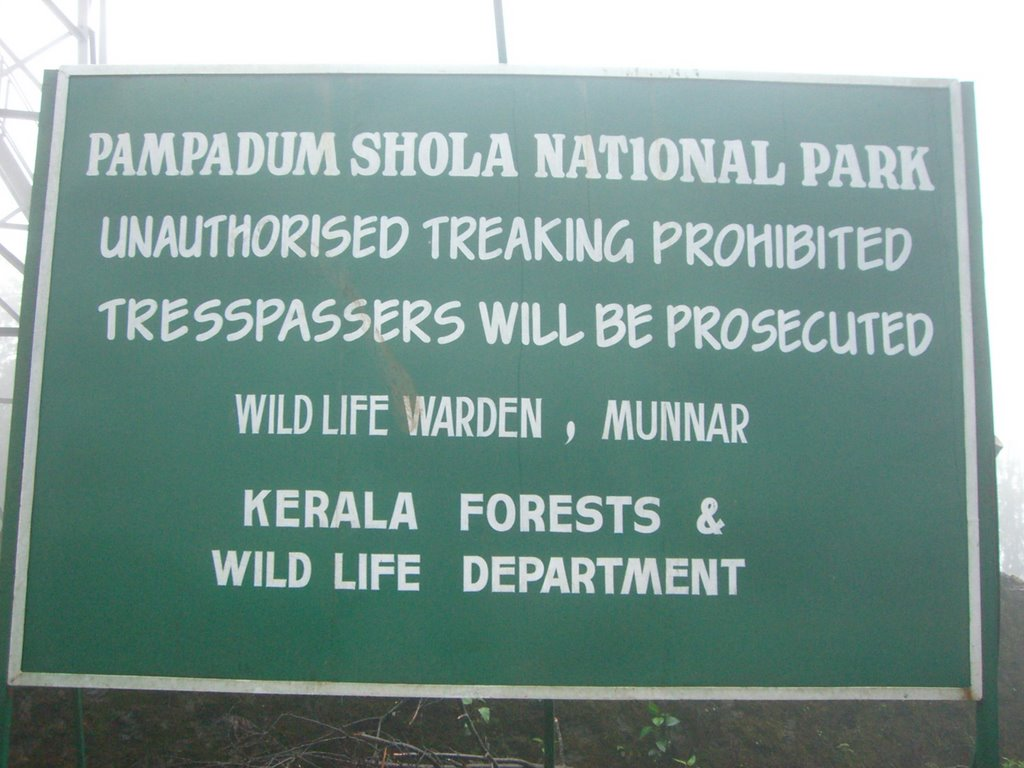
Unauthorized Trekking Prohibited

Berijam is located at the end of Pillar Rocks Road (old SH-18), 21 km (13.0 mi) southwest of Kodaikanal Lake. There were two roads from Berijam, one to Munnar town, about 40 km (24.9 mi) west and another to Kavunji village, 9 km (5.6 mi) north. The old roads are now overgrown with vegetation and are used only as walking trails by local villagers and trekkers. Encounters with wild animals including bison, leopards, elephants, tigers sometimes occur on these trails.

The Tamil Nadu Forest Department has restricted entry into the Berijam Lake area to between 9.30 a.m. and 3 p.m. for the general public. An entry permit (free) is required and can be obtained in person at the Forestry Department Office in Kodaikanal. Only ten permits are given each day, so early application the previous day is advised for timely access to the road west of Muir Point.

Tourists contact: (before 11:30 a.m.) Government of Tamil Nadu, Tourist Office, Annasalai, Kodaikanal 624 101, Tamil Nadu, India. Phone: 04542-241675.

== Trekking ==
Trekkers and researchers must get advance permission from the Tamil Nadu Forest Department and the Kerala Forests and Wildlife Department to travel along the route of the old road. A pamphlet, "Sholas For Survival", available from the District Forest Office, Kodaikanal describes 17 local treks ranging from leisurely walks to challenging day-long treks. This booklet provides a trekking map of the Palani Hills and details the degree of difficulty for each trek.

== Rivers ==
The Kodaikanal–Munnar Road crosses several rivers between Berijam and Top Station. There are no river crossings between Moir point and Berijam. Rivers that are crossed, traveling east to west include:

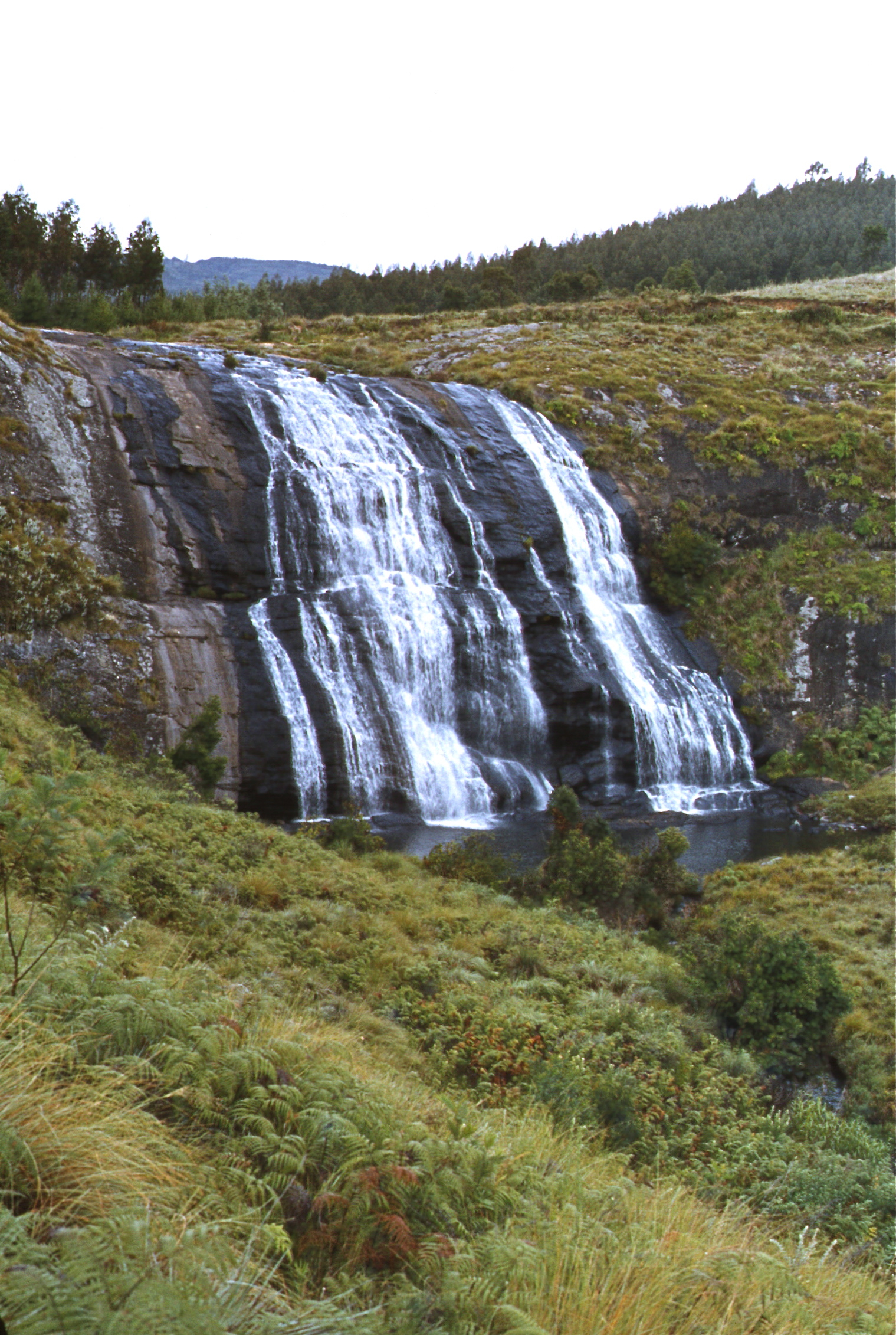
65 m (213 ft) Waterfall on Kathirikkai Odei, 1981

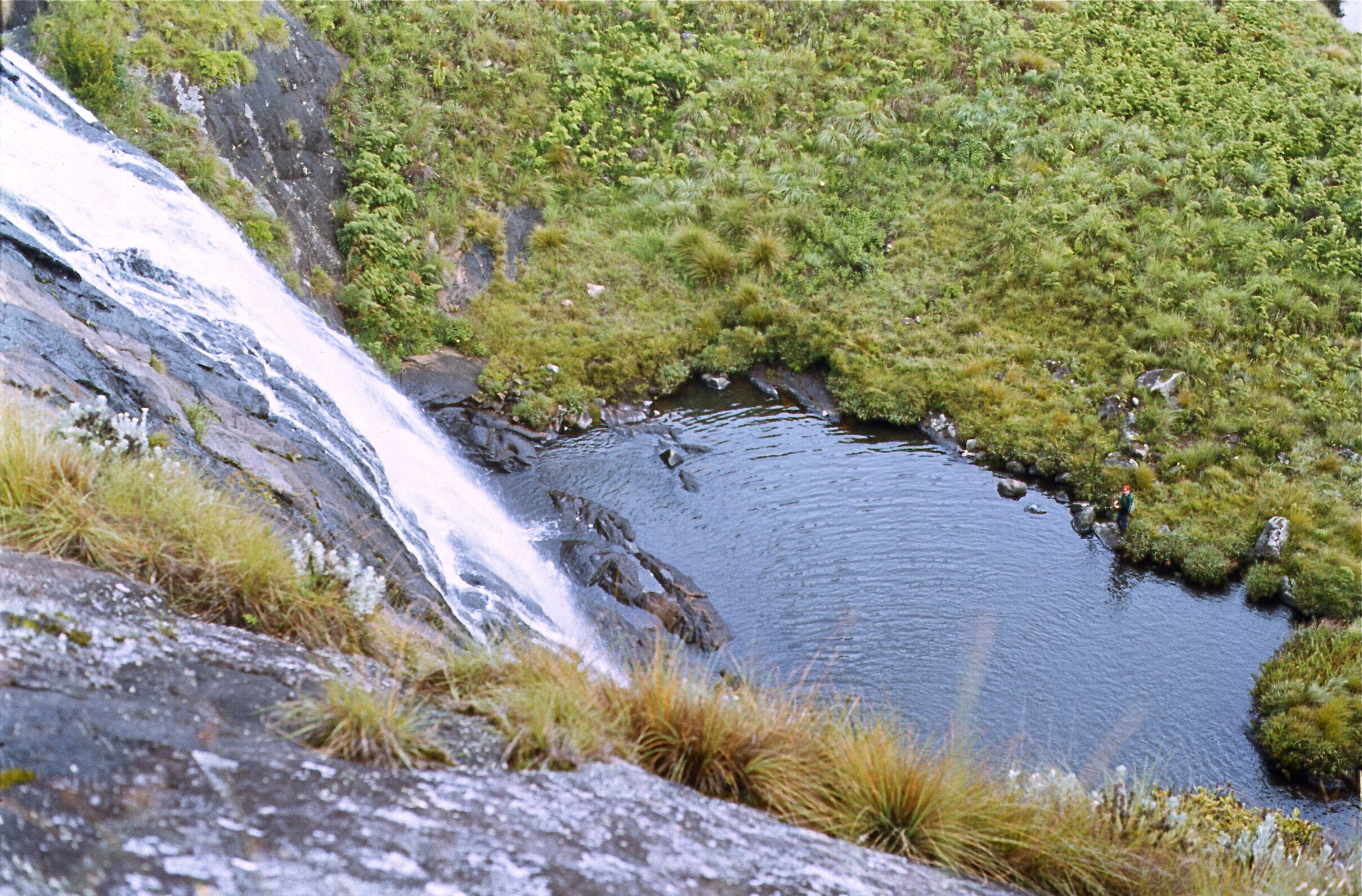
View from top of Kathirikkai Falls, 1981

1. Berijam River is crossed at 10°10′50″N 77°23′21″E, immediately before Berijam Camp.
2. Konalur River is crossed at 10°10′0″N 77°21′57″E, just south of Konalur Reservoir.
3. Konalur River II (for lack of correct name) is crossed at 10°9′59″N 77°21′33″E, just west of Konalur River.
4. Road recrosses Pulakachar at 10°9′36″N 77°21′9″E, 1.25 km (0.78 mi) SW of 1st crossing.
5. Sebastian Odai is crossed at 10°9′18″N 77°20′52″E. This stream originates 1.3 km (0.81 mi) south, near Marian Shola Bungalow.
6. First Trout Stream (proper name =?) is crossed at 10°8′55″N 77°20′10″E, just before the Forest Department Hut and other Forest Department buildings.

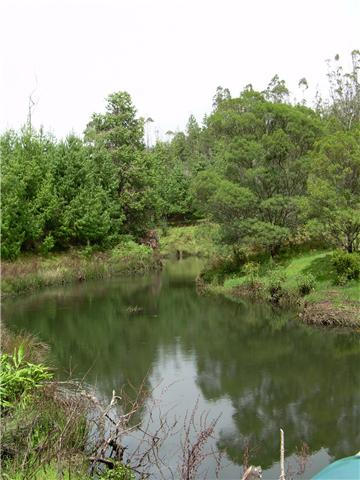
Pool above falls on Kathirikkai Odei

1. Kathirikkai Odei (the Second Trout Stream) is crossed at 10°9′8″N 77°19′21″E, 2.2 km (1.4 mi) after the Forest Dept Hut. It has small pool above a 50 m (160 ft) waterfall just south of the road crossing. This stream flows northeast 1.8 km (1.1 mi) where it is joined by the First Trout Stream, then 4.7 km (2.9 mi) north to join the Sebastian Odai which in 0.3 km (0.19 mi) joins the Poondi Stream.
2. Unnamed tributary is crossed at 10°9′57″N 77°17′27″E, just before Pulavachiar Forest Quarters. This stream originates 4.5 km (2.8 mi) SW, just above a 16 m (52 ft) waterfall, in the farthest SW corner of the Palani Hills.
3. Pulavachiar River crosses the road at 10°9′57″N 77°17′27″E, 0.5 km (0.31 mi) past the Pulavachiar Forest Quarters, near milestone: "Top Station 12". This is below the final climb up to Vunderavu hut. The river flows north, is joined by several tributaries, including the Poondi/Kavunji? stream and flows down the valley between Polur and Kilavarai. Just west of Kumbur, it becomes the major tributary of the Kumbur River which drops 800 m (2,600 ft) into Manjampatti Valley, passing Mungulpalum village and joining the Ten Ar river at Manjampatti Village.
4. The road crosses small unnamed tributaries 4 times, north of Pulavachiar crossing.
5. The road crosses only one small unnamed stream at 10°7′57″N 77°15′48″E, during its 550 m (1,800 ft) descent from Vandaravu to Top Station.

Most of these stream crossings still have stone and/or concrete bridges.

== Shelters ==
There are several structures on or near the road which may be available for overnight use by trekkers. Proceeding east to west, they are:

- The Forest Dept. checkpost at 10°12′39″N 77°26′53″E near Muir Point after Km 9 is not for overnight use but may offer temporary daytime shelter during a rain shower.
- Green Hut is an old Forest Dept. bungalow at 10°11′50″N 77°26′06″E near km 14, which has been used for overnight camping since at least 1943. It will be renovated soon.
- The Fire lookout tower at 10°11′32″N 77°25′11″E just past km 13, 8 km (5.0 mi) before Berijam lake, has a roofed hexagon structure not meant for overnight use but can offer short term safety from Gaur and elephants.
- There is a Forest Rest House at Berijam Lake, first developed as a British Transit Camp, at 10°10′54″N 77°23′20″E, at km 23, with limited accommodations, which serves as an overnight base camp for Forestry Department staff, researchers and trekkers. Trekkers must get advance permission to stay overnight there. Visitors must bring their own provisions, but cooking facilities are available.

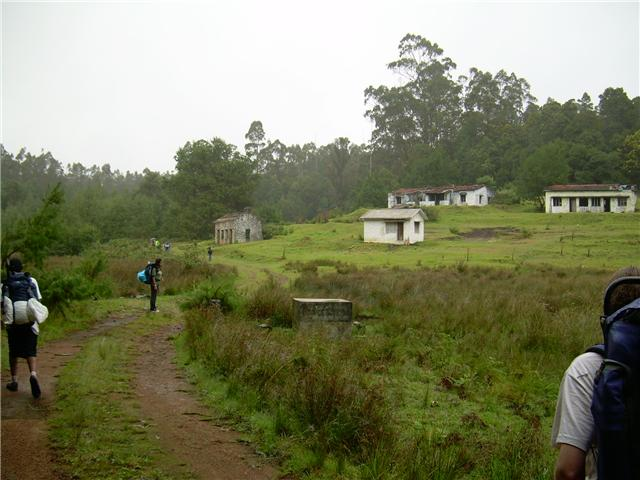
Munnar Road, showing Forest Dept. Hut and other Forest Dept. buildings

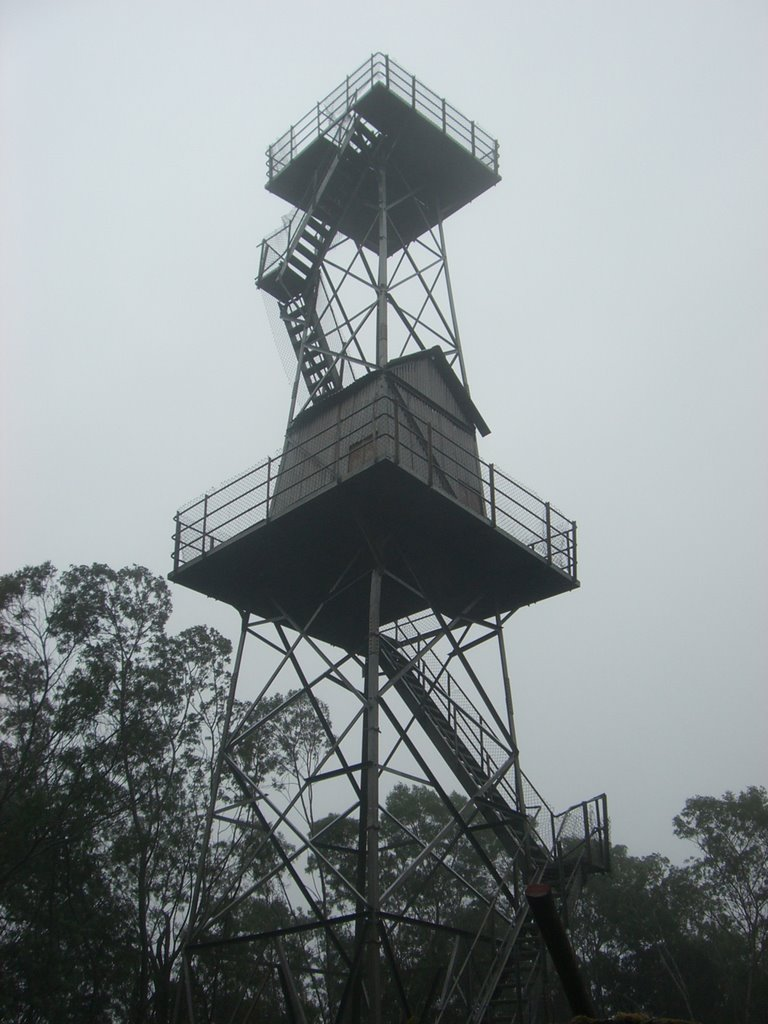
Pampadum Shola N.P. - Vandaravu observation tower

- There are two huts at a place variously called Marian Shola Bungalow and Sebastian Camp on a trail south of the road at 10°8′47″N 77°20′38″E. These are shown on the Army map. The bungalow there was fixed up several years ago and equipped with flush toilets and an elephant ditch was built around it. There is a separate kitchen building out back.
- There is a Forest Department Hut and other Forest Department buildings at 10°8′56″N 77°20′9″E at the first trout stream. Tamil Nadu Forest Dept. built the buildings to house Dept. staff who lived there while supervising wood cutting enterprises and road work crews. The laborers, mostly Sri Lankan Tamils, built temporary shacks of poles and matting. The shacks were abandoned when the cutters moved on to another area. The supervisors' "pucca" huts remain and now provide basic overnight shelter for trekkers. Limited overnight accommodations may be used with advance permission.
- Pulavachiar Forest Quarters is an old British Transit Camp at 10°9′56″N 77°17′42″E, near mile stone: "Top Station 12". This camp shows below a red star on the Army map. There is overnight shelter here for trekkers.
- Vandaravu camp is two structures at 10°9′26″N 77°16′26″E on the north slope of Vandaravu Peak, as shown on the 1959 Army Map. Current condition and suitability for shelter is unknown.
- There is a small corrugated steel shelter on the lower square platform of the observation tower at Pampadum Shola National Park on the west slope of Vandaravu Peak at 10°8′42″N 77°16′18″E This is a poor alternative shelter to the nice Forest Quarters less than 1 km (0.62 mi) away.
- There is a well maintained Kerala Forest quarters at 10°8′22″N 77°16′24″E near the Bandar Wireless Station on the south slope of Vandaravu Peak.
- There are limited commercial cabins and hotels at Top Station and many commercial accommodations of all classes at Munnar.

== Intersections ==
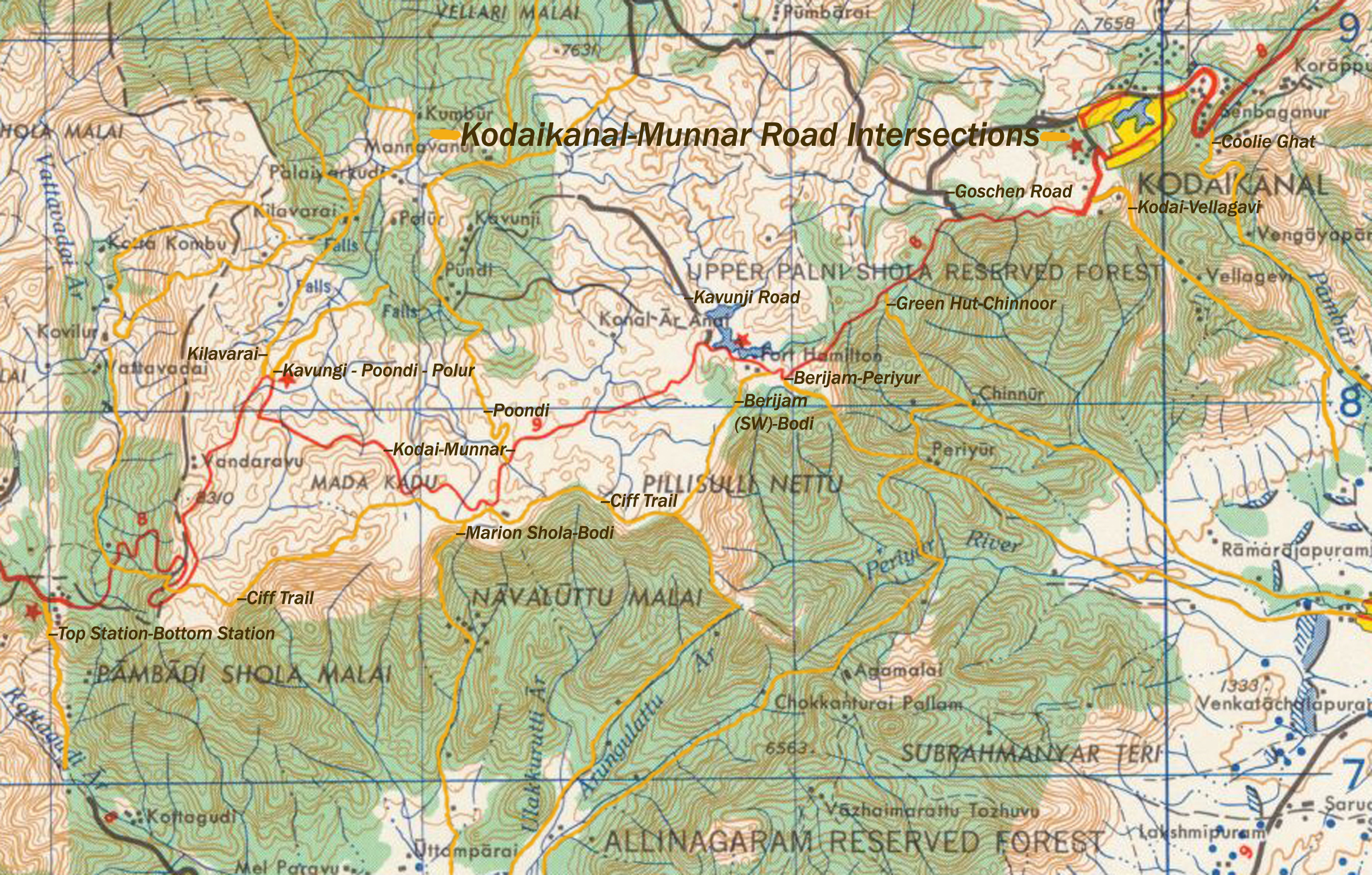
Map of intersecting roads and other trails

There are several well established side roads and other intersecting minor trails which branch off from the Kodaikanal–Munnar Road. Most of these show as "other trails" on the 1959 Army map. These intersections either go north to Upper Palani Hills villages or go south, dropping sharply down the south facing escarpment to hill villages en route and towns on the plains up to 1,800 m (5,900 ft) below. The Ciff Trail provides an alternate east–west route between Berijam Lake and the Kerala Forest Bungalow. There are over 40 recognized hiking routes from Kodaikanal using the Munnar road and these other trails.

Excluding Kodaikanal Municipal roads, going from east to west, the intersections are:

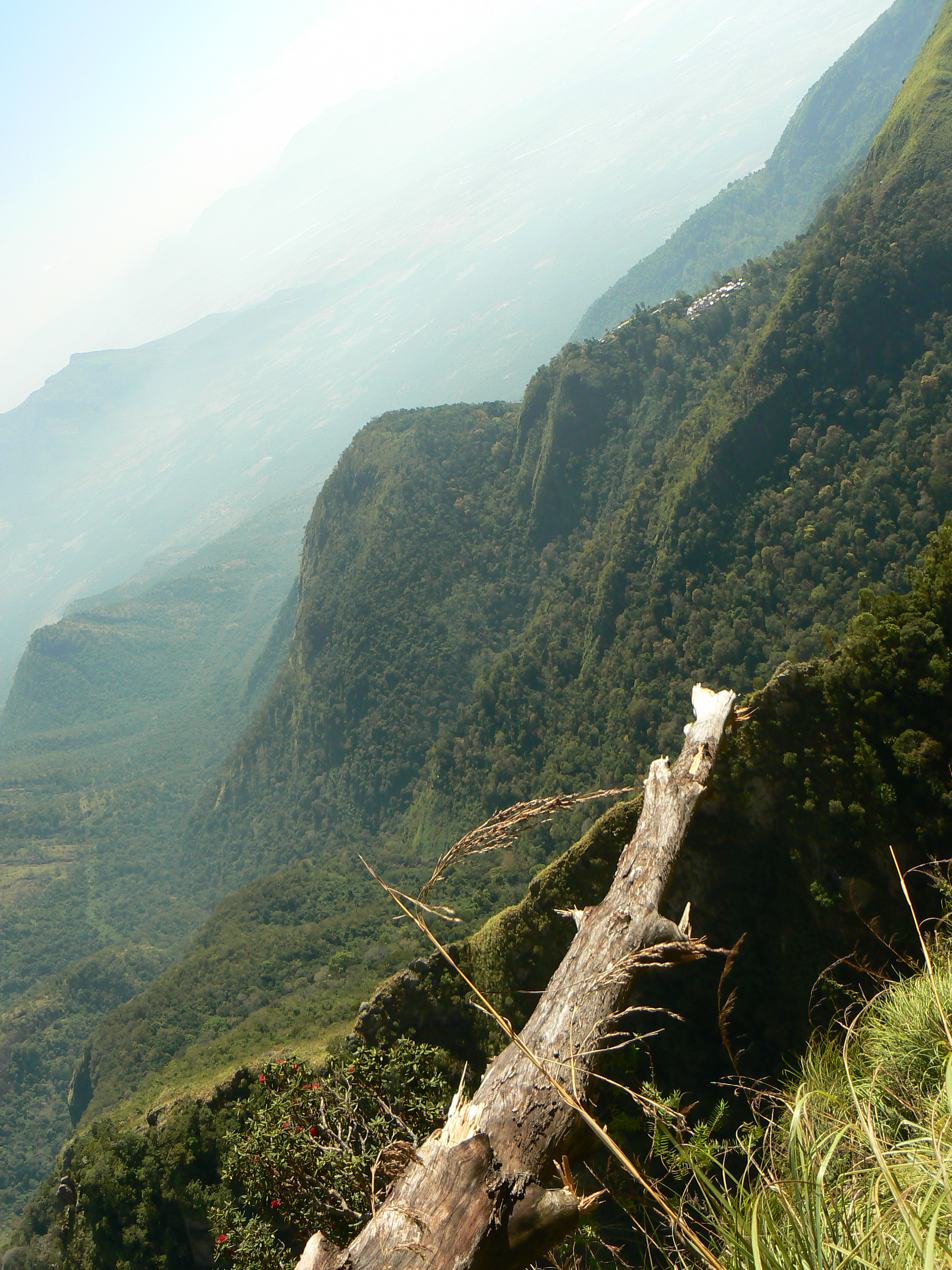
Vellagavi Village

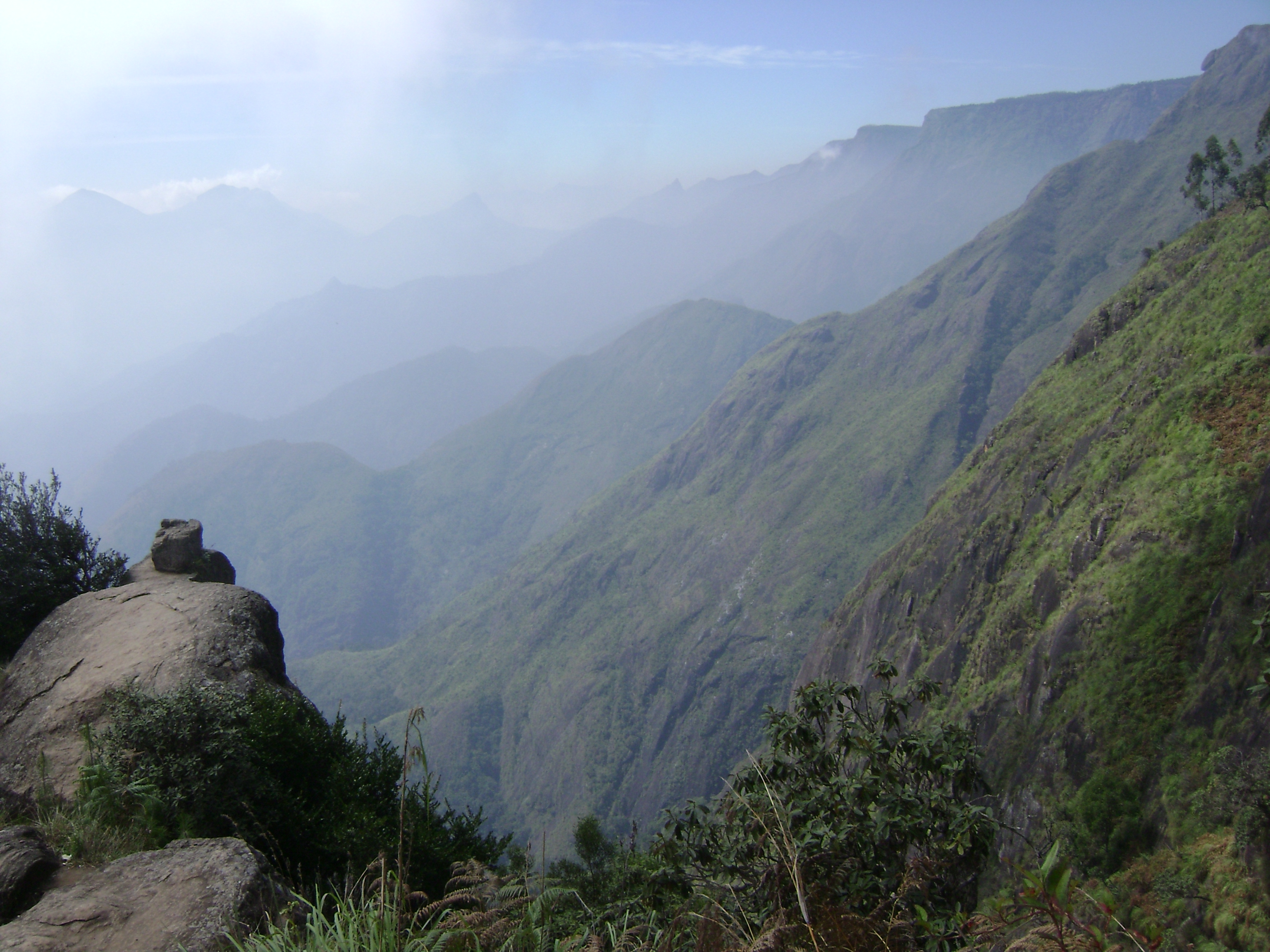
Pambar valley below Dolphins Nose

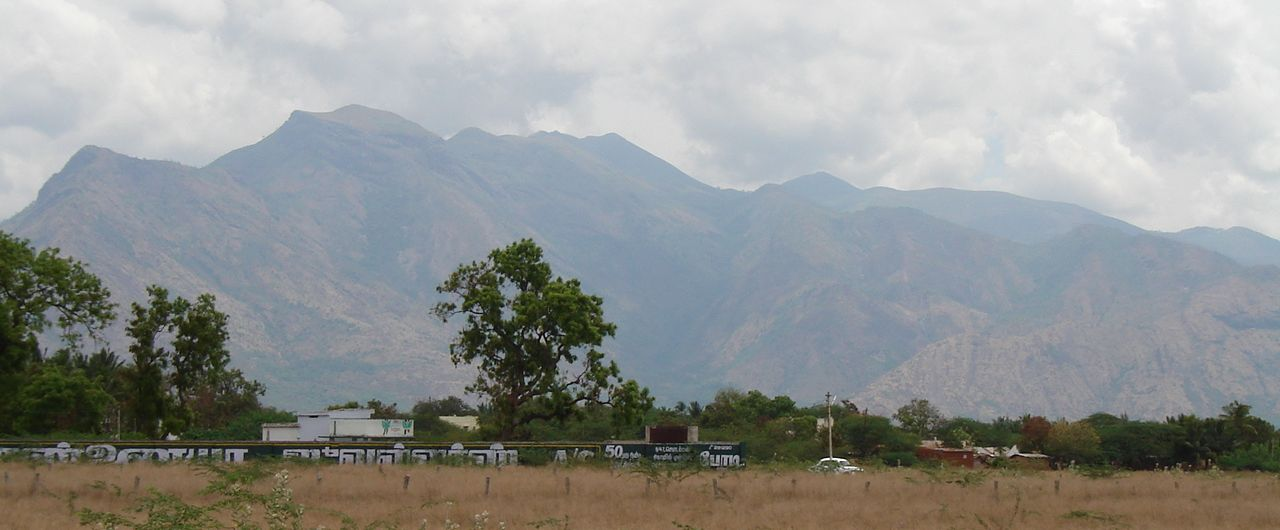
Palani Hills from Bodinayakanur

1. Kodai-Vellagavi footpath begins at 10°12′41″N 77°28′31″E at Pambar bridge near head of the Pambar river. Pambar Falls are nearby. Path descends steeply to Dolphins Nose, a dramatic perch over the Pambar valley below. A bridle path leads through Cardamom plantations, sholas and meadows leading to Vellagavi, an isolated old village with paved streets and a Muruga Temple. Footpath proceeds down west side of Vellagaviar River valley. The path becomes a dirt road along the river Vannathi odai. Kumbakarai Falls are at the bottom. Trekking distance is 8 km (5.0 mi). Trekking time is 5 hours.
2. Goschen Road forks north, at 10°12′39″N 77°26′53″E at Moir point at km 9.3, toward the villages of Poombarai and Kukkal to the northwest. Extensions to Mannavanur (junction), and Kavunji, together with a connecting road to Berijam Lake from near Kavunji, create a loop of about 40 mi (64.4 km) length, the "Forty Mile Round". In 1929, Sir Thomas Moir "turned the first sod", beginning construction of the "Goschen Road" which was completed in 1932.
3. Green Hut-Chinnoor footpath begins at 10°11′50″N 77°26′14″E near km 14 near Green Hut. The path follows the cliff top for 2.2 km (1.4 mi) then descends a steep ridge 2.1 km (1.3 mi) to Chinoor village.
4. Berijam-Periyur-Periyakulam
5. Berijam (SW)-Bodi footpath begins at 10°10′46″N 77°23′56″E, at sluiceway of reservoir, 2.1 km (1.3 mi) before Berijam camp near km 19. This trail continues 18 km (11 mi) down a ridge where it joins the Marion Shola-Bodi trail and continues another 8 km (5.0 mi) to Bodinayakanur town.
6. The Ciff Trail is an old 25 km (16 mi) walking trail providing an alternate east–west route between
  Berijam Lake and the Kerala Forest Bungalow below Vandaravu Peak on the Munnar Road. This trail closely follows the southernmost edge of the Palani plateau along the top of the rugged escarpment dropping down to the plains. Beginning at the head of the Berijam-Bodi trail, after 4.3 km (2.7 mi), the trail reaches the cliffs and forks off to the west. The trail proceeds 4.9 km (3.0 mi) precariously along the edge of a precipice to a small hill. It then proceeds 1.3 km (0.81 mi) over the hill to Marion Shola bungalow.
  1. After Marion Shola Bungalow the cliff trail heads west 1.7 km (1.1 mi) along the top of Marian Shola and 3.7 km (2.3 mi) to and over Ibex peak to the top of Ibex Cliff. After 0.8 km (0.50 mi) along this dramatic cliff, the trail heads 2.8 km (1.7 mi) up and over another hill and again skirts the cliff top. The trail then goes 2.4 km (1.5 mi) around the north side of a small hill and back along the cliff top to the furthest southwestern point of the Palani Hills. Finally, the trail goes 3.1 km (1.9 mi) north through grasslands at the top of a forested hillside, then northeast to rejoin the Munnar Road at the Kerala Forest Bungalow.
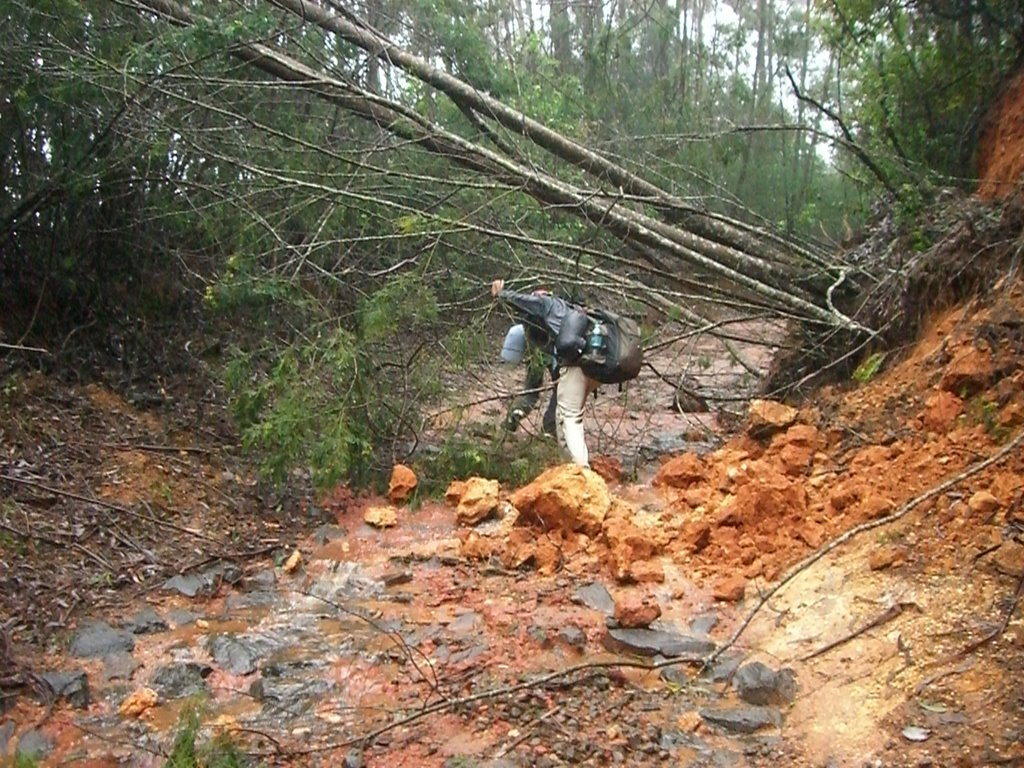
    Beginning of Kavunji road near Berijam
7. Kavunji Road junction is at 10°10′53″N 77°23′17″E just past Berijam Camp. It is an overgrown road between Berijan Camp and Kavunji village.
8. Konalar-Bodi footpath begins at 10°10′04″N 77°22′28″E starts 3.3 km (2.1 mi) after Kavunji Junction and joins the Berijam (SW)-Bodi footpath 3.9 km (2.4 mi) downhill.
9. Marion Shola-Bodi footpath begins at 10°8′33″N 77°19′57″E at 2,280 m (7,480 ft) elevation. After passing steeply down 4 km (2.5 mi) through the shola and along a small ridge, the path follows an unnamed stream 7.3 km (4.5 mi) to Uttamparai village at 400 m (1,300 ft) elevation on the plains. Bodi is 7.9 km (4.9 mi) by road from the village.
10. Kavungi - Poondi - Polur trail at 10°10′31″N 77°17′32″E, 1.2 km (0.7 mi) north of Pulavachiar River bridge, is a popular trekking trail between Kavungi - Poondi - Polur Road to the northeast and the Vandaravu peak area.
11. Kilavarai trail, also at 10°10′31″N 77°17′32″E At about 40th Km from Kodaikkanal, a forest road leads to Kilavarai. Sholas, grasslands, Eucalyptus and wattle plantations alternate. Be cautious around Gaur Vellaiyan a 52 ft (16 m) waterfalls at a picnic spot en route. Enjoy the high altitude meadows. Trout fish live in the areas streams.
12. Klavara Trail starting at 10°10′3″N 77°17′7″E goes 4.2 km (2.6 mi) west to Klavara Village. A vehicle road then goes south 5.3 km (3.3 mi) to Top Station and north 2 km (1.2 mi) to Vattavada, another 1.3 km (0.81 mi) to Kovilur and 2.6 km (1.6 mi) more to Kadaveri.
13. Top Station-Bottom Station footpath starting at 10°7′27″N 77°14′40″E, elevation 1,900 m (6,200 ft), follows the 4.06 km (2.5 mi) route of the old Top Station-Kottagudi ropeway. The path descends 1,198 m (3,930 ft) from Top Station to Kotagudi. The winding path is about 8.3 km (5.2 mi) long. From Kotagudi a rough and winding road descends 9.7 km (6.0 mi) through the foothills along the valley of the Kotagudi River to the level plains where it proceeds smoothly 6.4 km (4.0 mi) to Bodinayakanur.

== Roadside forests ==
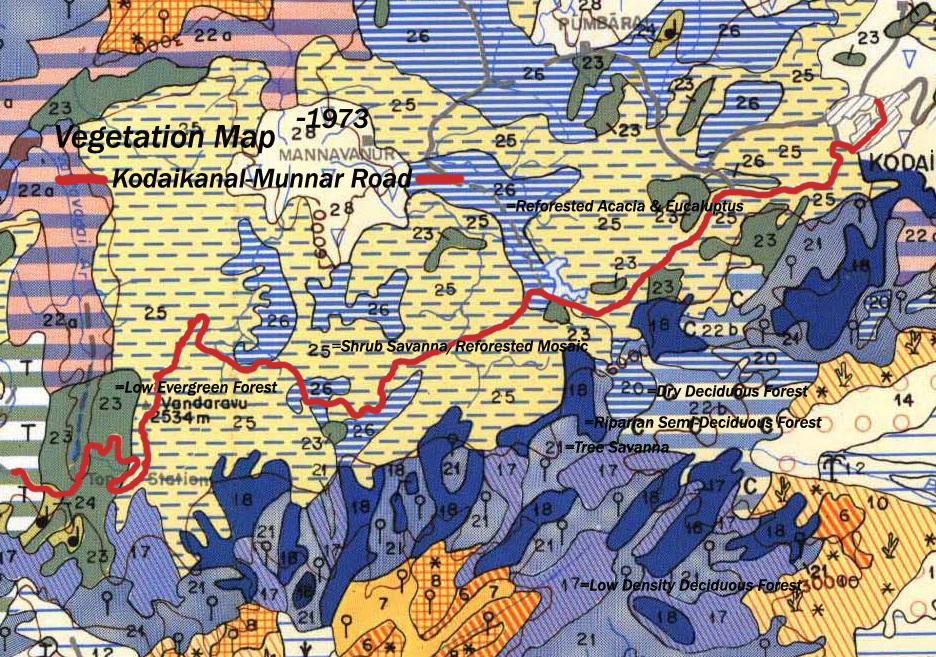
Kodai-Munnar Road Vegetation Map 21: tree savanna 25: shrub-savanna/reforested 26: reforested: Acacia, Eucylyptus

The upper Palani Hills route of the Kodaikanal Munnar road is part of the Western Ghats of India. Some of the very rare and endangered plants and animals of India are found here. including intact relics of primary indigenous vegetation and a large number of non-native plants. The area is one of the 25 biodiversity hotspots of the world.

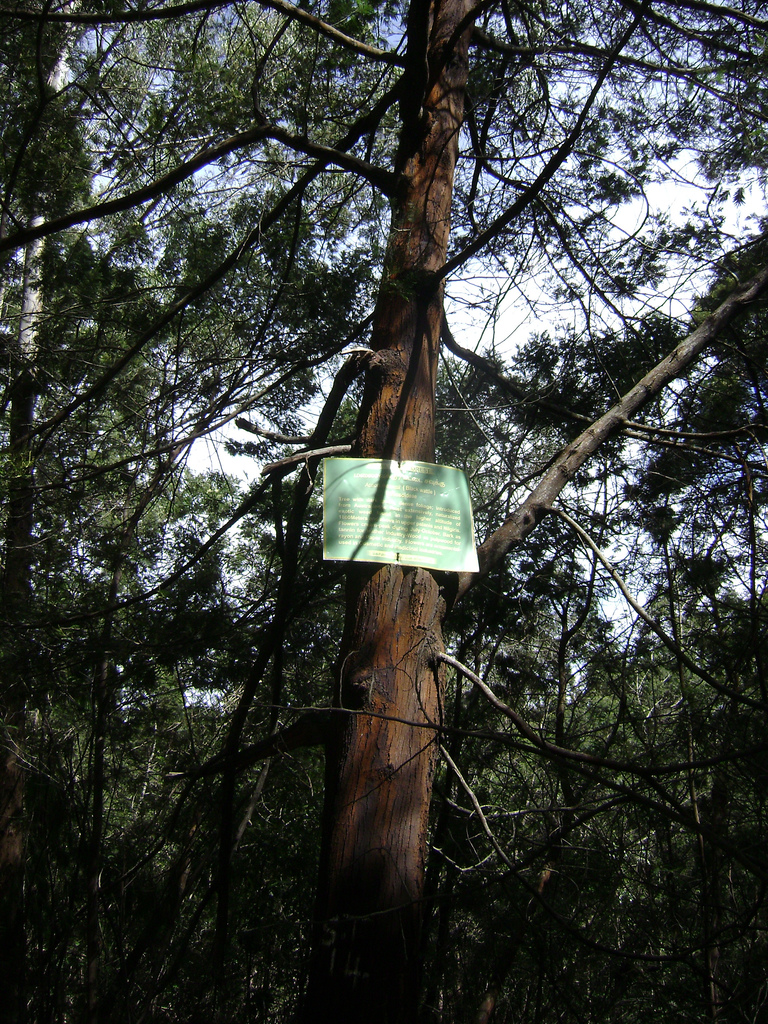
Mature Black Wattle on Goschen Road

The road originally passed through an area of frost-tolerant shola/montane grassland mosaic interspersed with pockets of stunted shola forests in the valleys. In 1900, 75% of the 385 km^{2} (149 sq mi) area of the Upper Palni Hills, was grassland. This shola/grasslands ecosystem was effective in conserving monsoon rainfall and letting it soak in to replenish the watertable for year-round release into the streams.

From 1948 through the 1960s the Tamil Nadu Forest Department planted large areas of indigenous grasslands along the road with black wattle for producing tanning agents for use in the leather industry. blue gum (eucalyptus) and Mexican weeping pine were planted in order to provide a reliable alternative firewood supply to protect the native shola forests from cutting for firewood. The 1973 vegetation map shows these imported tree species already taking over the grasslands around the road. A detailed dynamic map of 2002 vegetation shows distribution of various plantation species that have replaced most of the grasslands and native evergreen forests. Another 2002 map of Palni Hills, showing distribution of wattle plantations, also shows wattle dominating the route of the Kodaikanal Munnar Road. Exotic forests now cover over 80% of the area which was previously covered by Grasslands. These non-native species now dominate thousands of acres once dominated by native grasses.

These extensive wattle plantations are sometimes blamed as the major cause of reduced soil moisture and stream flows across upper Palni catchments, though it is likely that reduced rainfall during the Southwest monsoon period, combined with a pattern of heavy downpours and longer dry spells between rain events in the non-monsoon months is also responsible. Wattle plantations in the upper Palanis seem to help regrowth of indigenous shola species and associated wildlife, and also reduce cutting of shola forests by providing superior fuel wood. It is probable that these old, non-productive plantations, that are slow-growing or partially invaded with native woody species, are similar to native forest in terms of water use.

== New route ==
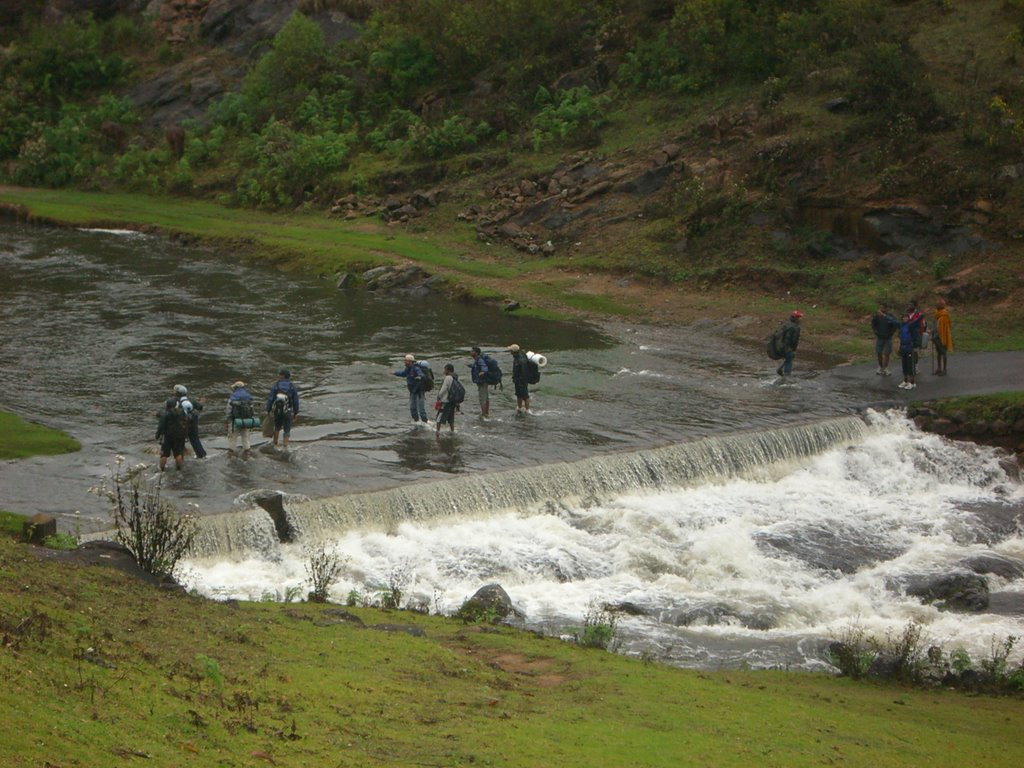
Level crossing of unnamed river in flood near Kilavarai

Though the old evacuation route is now impassable for vehicles, there remains a desire and need among farmers and tourists for a direct road link between Kodaikanal and Munnar.

The Kadavari – Kilavarai road is a horse trail used by farmers of Kadavari to take their products to Kodaikanal, via Kilavarai. It is possible but not practical to pass here by off-road vehicle. Straight-line distance from Kadavari to Kilavarai is 5.9 km (3.7 mi). The new route is 14.6 km (9.1 mi).

This is the least improved section of a new Munnar–Kodaikanal Highway proposed by the Roads and Bridges Development Corporation of Kerala Ltd. This highway would provide a direct road link between the two popular hill stations of Munnar and Kodaikanal. The proposed road connects Vattavada (near Munnar) and Kadavari at the Kerala–Tamil Nadu border. Length of the proposed Vattavada - Kadavari Road is 22.37 km (13.9 mi) A 4.5 km (2.8 mi) extension of the above road from Kadavari to Kilavarai in Tamil Nadu is also proposed.

The proposed road would reduce the travel distance between the two hill stations 41% from 198 km (123.0 mi) (via Kodaikanal – Perumal Malai – Mayiladum Parai – Mooliyaru – Oothu – Falls View – Ganguvarpatti – Kodai Ghat Road – Periyakulam – Theni – Bodinayakkanur – Bodimettu – Devikulam – Munnar) to 116 km (72.1 mi), saving a driving distance of 82 km (51.0 mi). It would provide a reliable link between the unimproved and unconnected rural communities of Vattavada and Kilavarai, improving the living standards of the people. Estimated cost of the project is Rs. 942 Million (2003 estimate). M/s Mecon Limited has completed the feasibility study and submitted the final report.

== Gallery ==
Images on and around Kodaikanal-Munnar Road
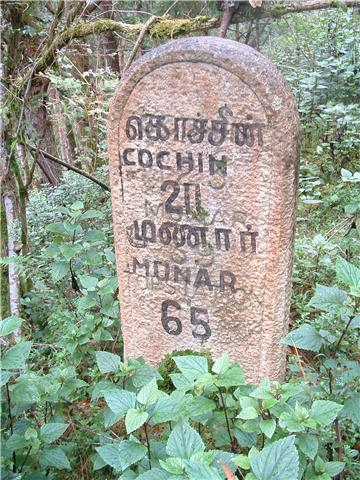
Kilometers/Miles marker on Munnar Road at Km 16, 2008

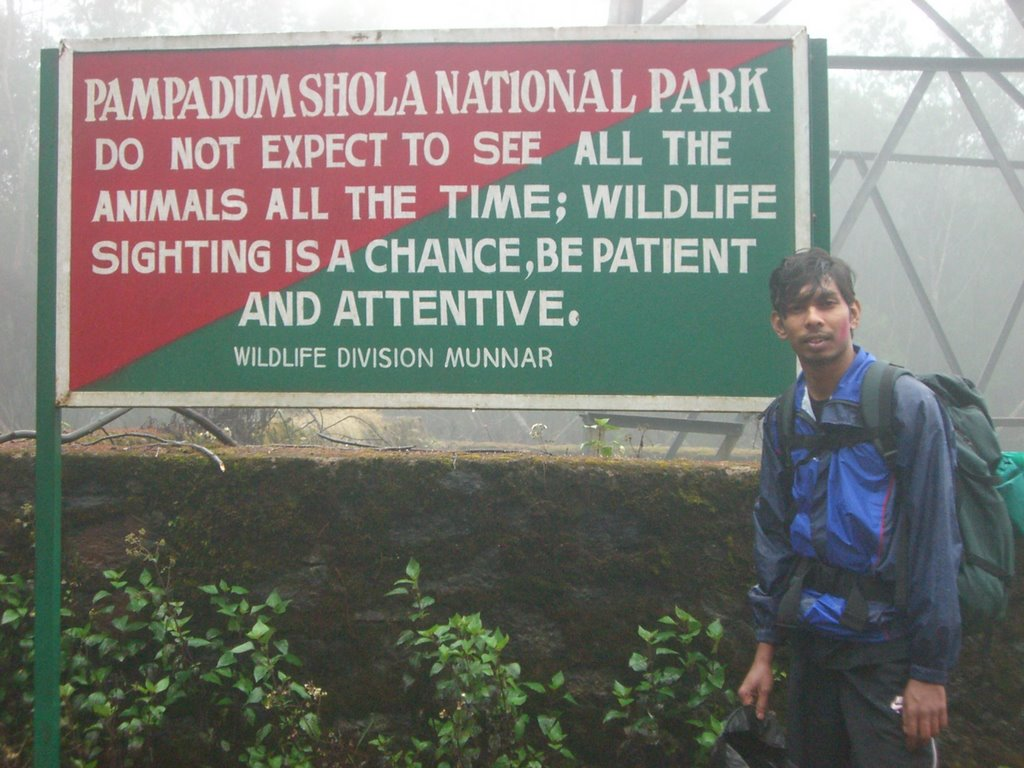
Do not expect to see all the animals

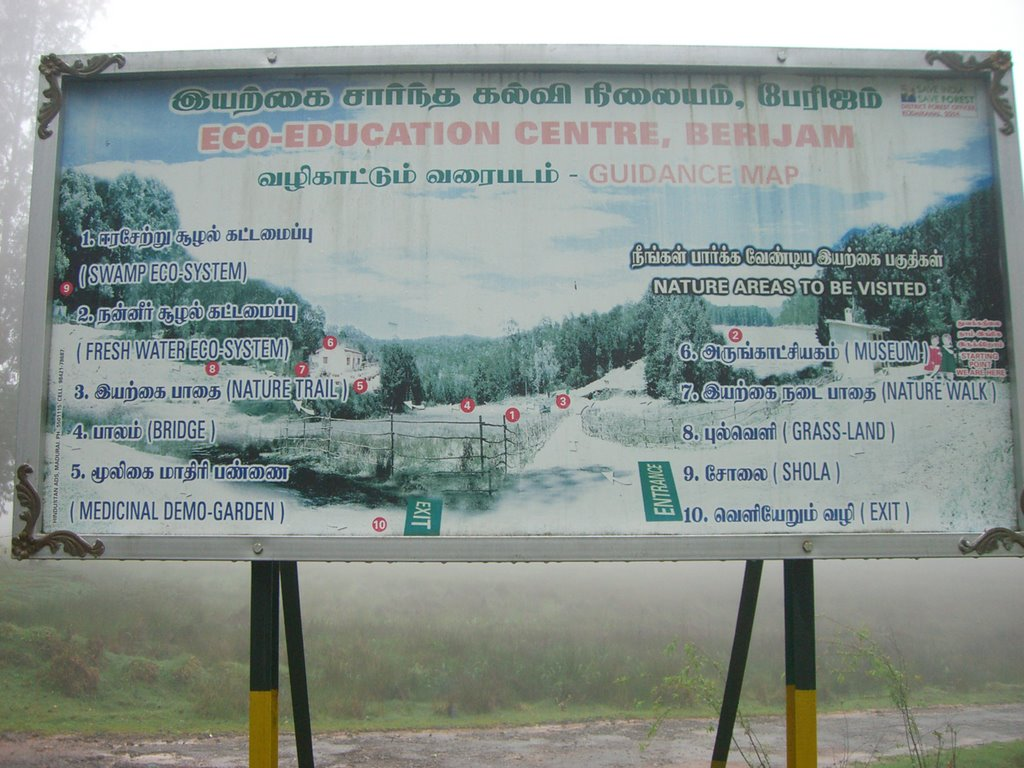
Berijam has an Eco-Education Center for visitors

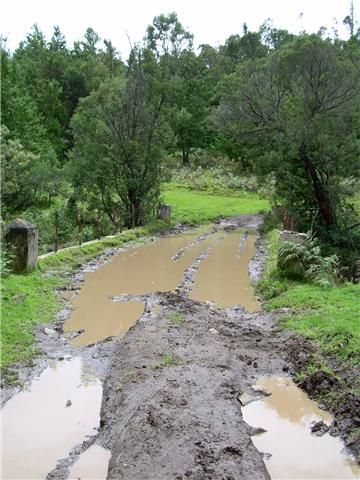
Bridge over Kathirikkai Odei, 2010

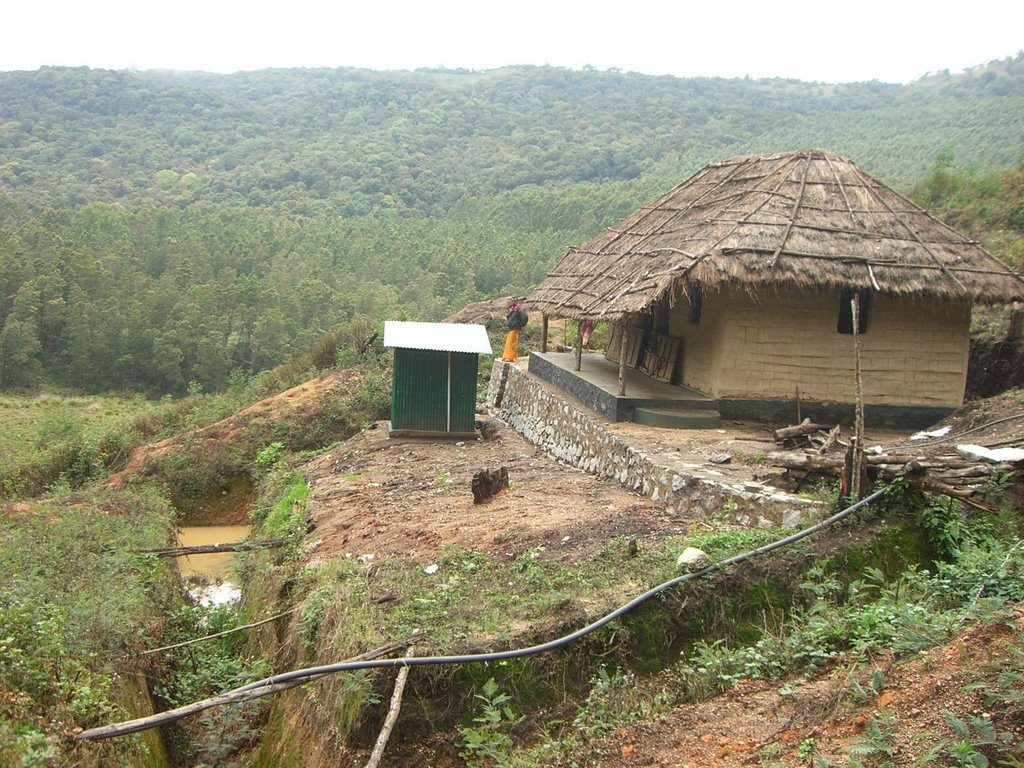
New cabin with elephant proof trench near Top Station

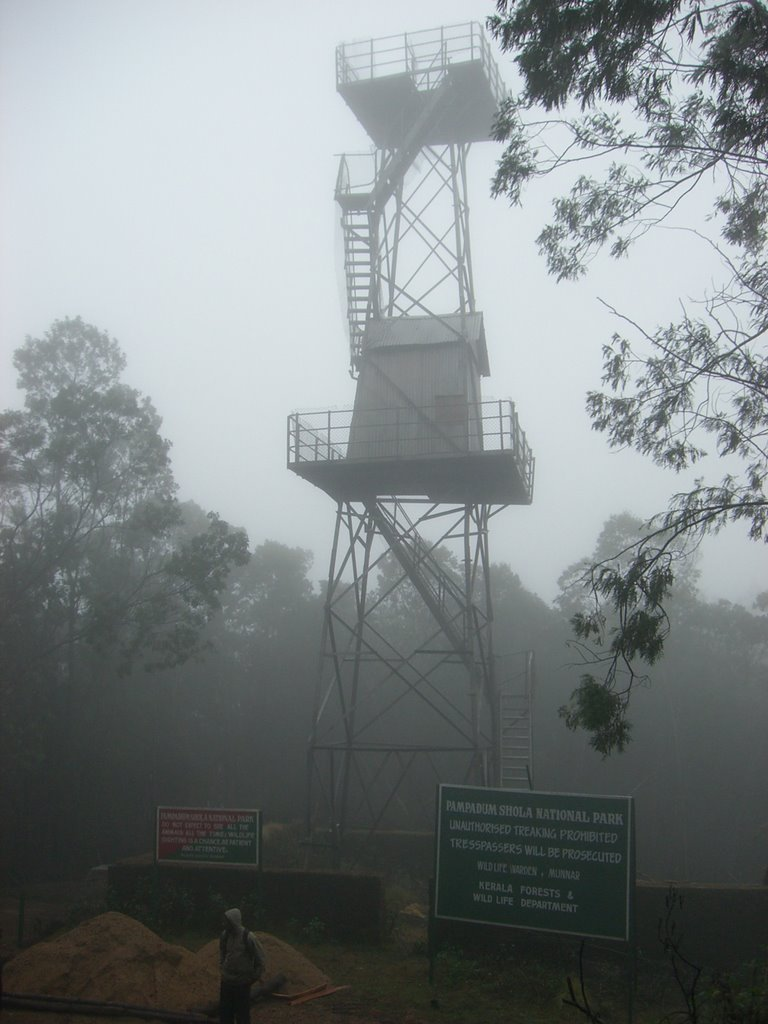
Vandaravu observation tower and signs at Pampadum National Park
