= Berijam Lake =

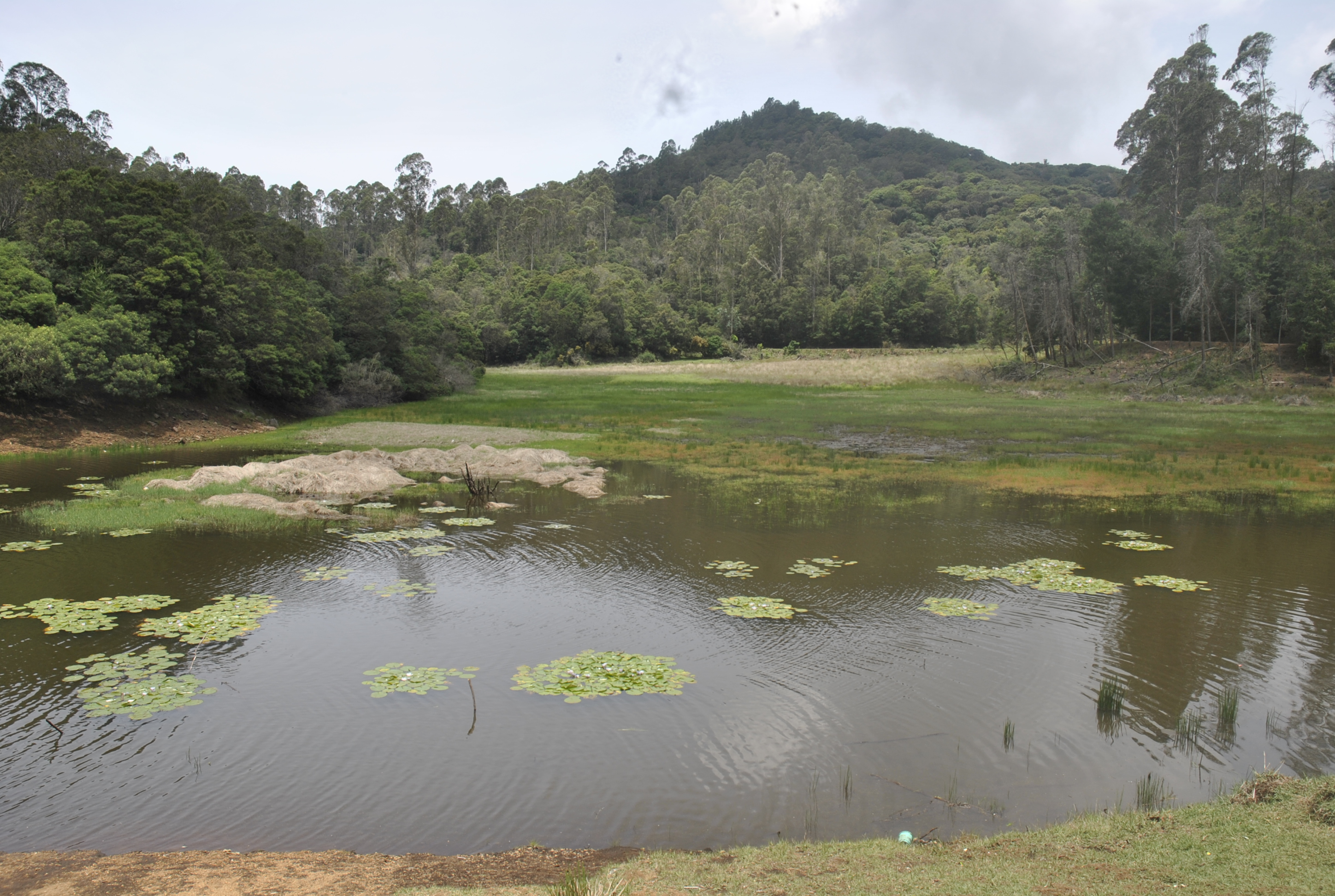

- Location within Tamil Nadu
- Location: Dindigul district, Tamil Nadu, South India
- Coordinates: 10°11′0″N 77°23′44″E
- Lake type: Freshwater reservoir
- Catchment area: 7.8 km^{2} (3.0 sq mi)
- Basin countries: India
- Max. length: 3 km (1.9 mi)
- Surface area: 24 ha (59 acres)
- Water volume: 2,180,000 m^{3} (77,000,000 cu ft)
- Surface elevation: 2,165 m (7,103 ft)
- Settlements: Forest Rest House

Berijam Lake is a reservoir near Kodaikanal town in Dindigul district of Tamil Nadu, South India. It is at the old site of "Fort Hamilton", in the upper Palani hills. The lake, created by a dam with sluice outlets, is part of a micro–watershed development project. Periyakulam town, 18.7 kilometres (11.6 mi) to the SE, gets its public drinking water from the lake. The lake's water quality is excellent.

== Access ==
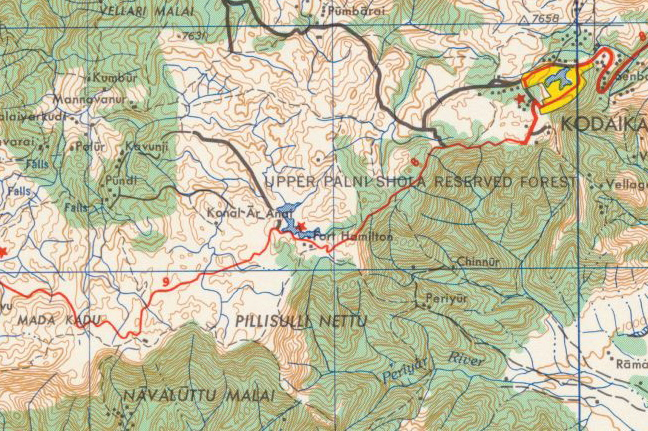
Old Fort Hamilton site at Berijam Lake

Berijam is located at the end of Pillar Rocks Road (old SR-18), 21 km (13.0 mi) southwest of Kodaikanal Lake. map There were two roads from Berijam, the Kodaikanal–Munnar Road to Munnar town, about 40 km (24.9 mi) west and another going to Kavunji village, 9 km (5.6 mi) north. The old roads are now overgrown with vegetation and used as walking trails by local villagers and trekkers. Encounters with wild animals including bison, elephants and leopards sometimes occur on these trails.

The Tamil Nadu Forest Department has restricted entry into the Berijam Lake area to between 9.30 a.m. and 3 p.m. for the general public. Entry permits are issued at the Forestry Department Office in Kodaikanal. Only a limited number of visitors are allowed in the park each day. There is a forest check–post which prohibits unauthorized entry through the road leading to Berijam Lake. Beyond km marker 13 on the Berijam road there is an observation tower from where one may have a fine view of Berijam Lake and the surrounding forest.

Berijam has a Forest Department Camp including an Eco-Education Center for visitors. Nature areas to be visited here include: swamp ecosystem, fresh water ecosystem, nature trail, bridge, medicinal demonstration garden, museum, nature walk, grassland and shola.(guide map)

Site visits are organized for authorized researchers. Trekkers can get permission to stay overnight. There is a forest rest house with limited accommodations which serves as an overnight base camp for Forestry Department staff, researchers and trekkers. Visitors must bring their own provisions.

== History ==
There was originally a swamp here known as the Berijam swamp. The previous existence here of a large lake, evidence of which was visible nearby, was first recorded in 1864 by Colonel Douglas Hamilton of the 21st Regiment of the Madras Native Infantry. No written record or even local legend regarding the existence of this ancient lake survives. However, judging from visible traces of its shoreline which still remained in 1906, it must have been nearly 5 mi (8.0 km) long, up to 3,960 ft (1,210 m) wide and up to 70 ft (21 m) deep. It was apparently formed by the side of a hill slipping down into a valley which slopes northwards, and damming up the stream which ran to the Amaravati River at the bottom of it. This stream apparently eventually cut its way through the huge natural embankment so formed, and thus emptied the lake this landslide/dam had once created. The dam was about 600 ft (180 m) long and the breach in it was about 300 ft (91 m) across and 90 ft (27 m) deep.

In 1864, Colonel Hamilton submitted a report stating that the Berijam Lake area was the best site in the Palani Hills for a military cantonment or Sanatorium. A military outpost later built here, Fort Hamilton, was named for him. There was in fact no 'fort' at the place, only a small hut.

Berijam lake was artificially created in 1867, when Sir Vere Levigne, Collector of Madurai, donated part of his personal retirement funds for building the dam. Subsequently, the dam and reservoir were enlarged and a pipeline was built to supply drinking water to the Periyakulam Municipality. The scheme was completed in 1912 at a cost equivalent to US$138,500.

Berijam has a 100-year-old 2-story brick building, partly damaged and blackened over the years, with a bright yellow painted name reading "Britisher's Transit Camp". This is one of several transit camps built every 15 km (9 mi) for the soldiers to rest along the 230 km (143 mi) British "Escape Route" from Kodaikanal via Top Station and Munnar to Kochi, built during World War II. While most of the transit camps are now either dilapidated or demolished, the one at Berijam still stands.

Berijam Lake has been studied palynologically revealing a 20,000 years story by pollen particles deposited in lake sediments. The time span between 20,000-17,000 years before present (B.P.) experienced cold and dry climatic conditions. After this period arid oxidizing environmental conditions prevailed for a period of 2500 years. The time span between 14,500–7;000 years B.P. witnessed a climatic amelioration phase leading to a warm and humid climate. From about 7,000 years B.P. to present the area has had a cool and humid climate.

== Hydrology ==
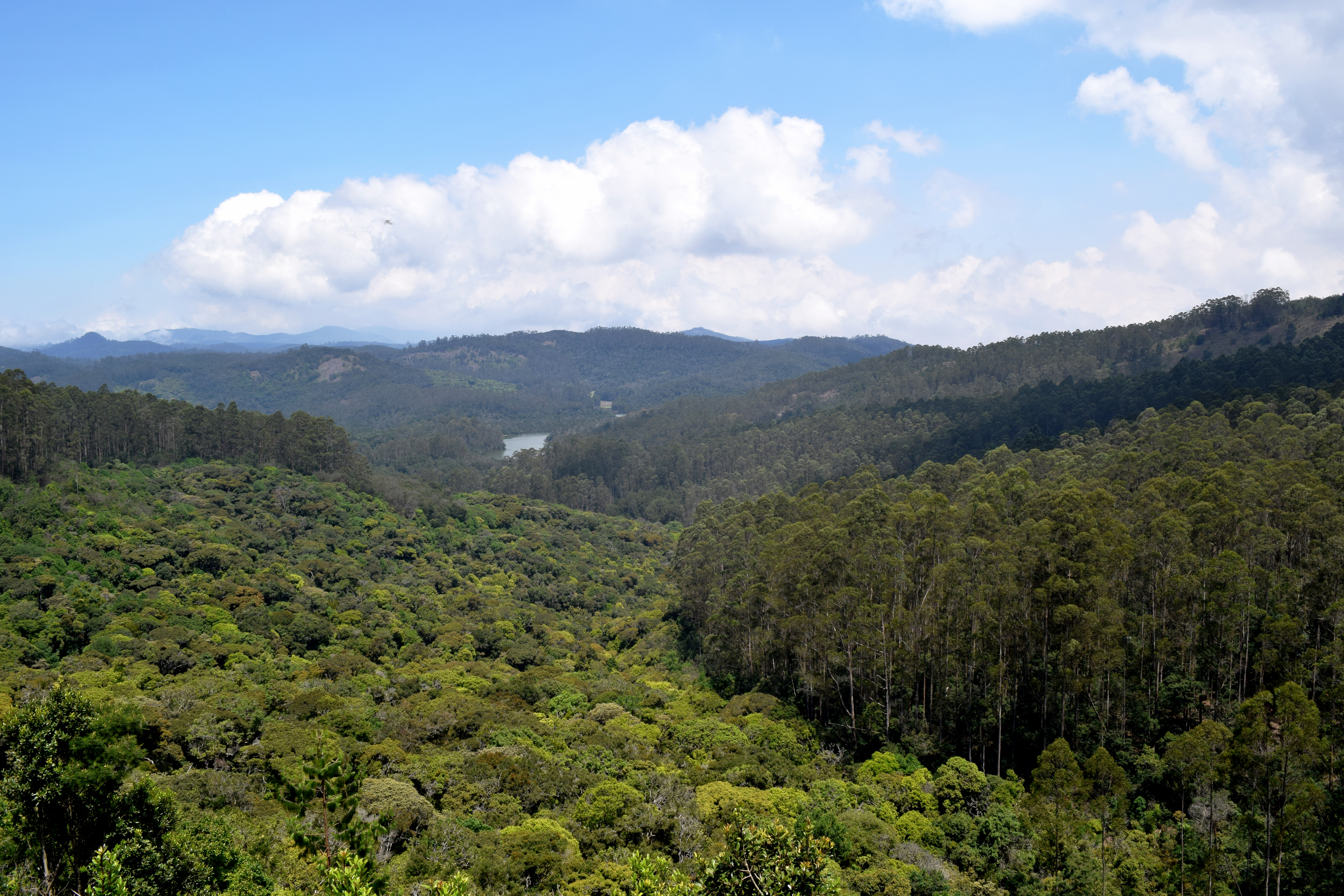
From east

The Upper Palani Hills catchment basin drains into the Lake. Rainfall is the chief source of water into the lake. Average annual rainfall in the hill area is 1,500 mm (4.9 ft). The mean day temperature in the coolest months is below 17 °C (62.6 °F) in the higher areas. The lake is formed below the Palani hill ranges at the origin of the Varahanadhi (Varaha River) which is used for purposes of water supply and irrigation. As a part of the World Bank funded Water Resources Consolidation Project (WRCP) of Tamil Nadu, sedimentation condition was assessed for a large number of reservoirs including Berijam reservoir. This indicated that the 1.91 cubic hectometres (1,550 acre⋅ft) gross storage capacity of the reservoir in 1911 decreased to 1.804 cubic hectometres (1,463 acre⋅ft) in 1987. The percentage reduction of storage due to siltation is 23%, over a period of 76 years. Berijam Lake had stable land conditions, thus erosion was less and the lake received less sediment but more organic matter in the proportion of (5.5–41.8%). The rate of sedimentation is indirectly proportional to the influx of organic matter.

Water quality

On the basis of chemical parameters and nutrient load studies, the Berijam lake has been categorized as oligotrophic with a tendency to eutrophication over time due to plankton growth in the lake. This conclusion is supported by oxygen deficits in the bottom due to the chemocline condition of the lake.

== Flora and funga ==
Berijam is rich in flora and fauna (some are pictured in the gallery) and has a few original eco–initiatives to its credit, namely, South India's first field–oriented eco-education centre set up by the Forest Department, an exclusive medicinal plants demonstration garden spread over 1.0 ha (2.5 acres) and a model swamp observation area created to educate the public. A rare species of free floating insectivorous bladderwort plant called utricularia australis is said to be found here.

The catchment of the Berijam Lake in the Palani hills falls under the once extensive shola grassland ecosystem, also called the "cloud forest". These grasslands constitute a complex and highly diverse plant community which in turn supports a wide range of fauna from insects to large mammals. With the sholas they constitute one of the world's rarest, most biodiverse and spectacular of landscapes. Where the grassland has been destroyed by industrial timber plantations, streams and marshes have dried out. Data on germination and cultivation of c. 250 shola species and long term biographies of c. 70 shola tree species in the area have been published.

Medicinal flora and funga

Development and cultivation of medicinal plants like Digitalis, Pyrethrum, belladona, Dioscorea sp. and Mentha is an active programme launched by the Tamil Nadu Agricultural University through the 40 hectares (99 acres) research centre of the Central Institute of Medicinal and Aromatic Plants (CIMAP) near Berijam. Commercial marketing of high yielding varieties of these plants is now being actively pursued. Psilocybin mushrooms which produce hallucinogenic effects when consumed, and other species of mushrooms grow around Berijam.

== Fauna ==
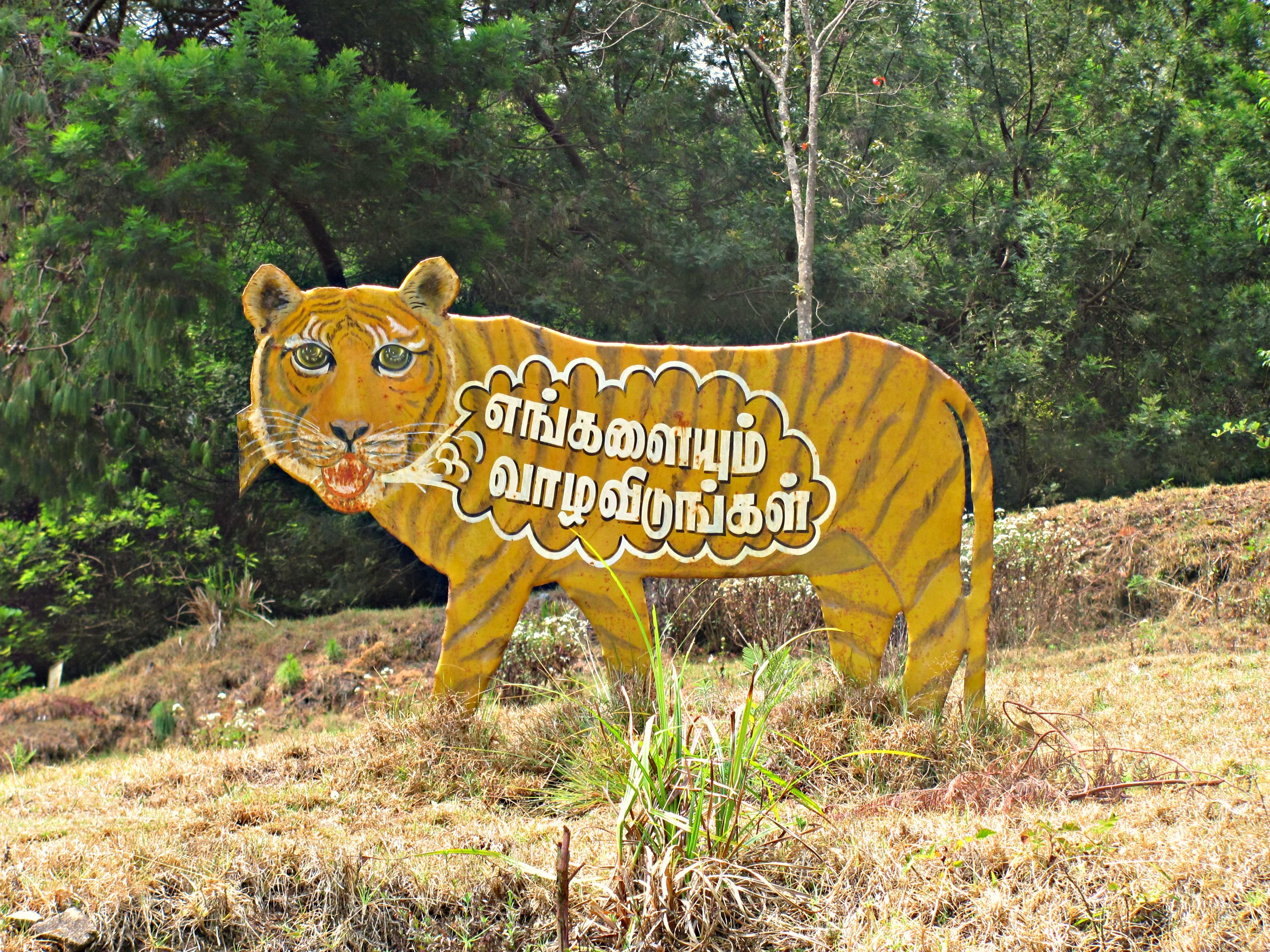
Sign board at Berijam lake meaning: "Let us also Live"

The Upper Palni Shola forest reserve surrounding Berijam lake has a rich faunal population comprising the following.

Avifauna

- Resident birds include crested serpent eagles, pariah kites, pale-rumped swallows and the edible-nest swiftlets.
- Migratory birds wintering here include the common rosefinch, the blue chat, several leaf-warblers and Blyth's reed-warbler.

Mammals

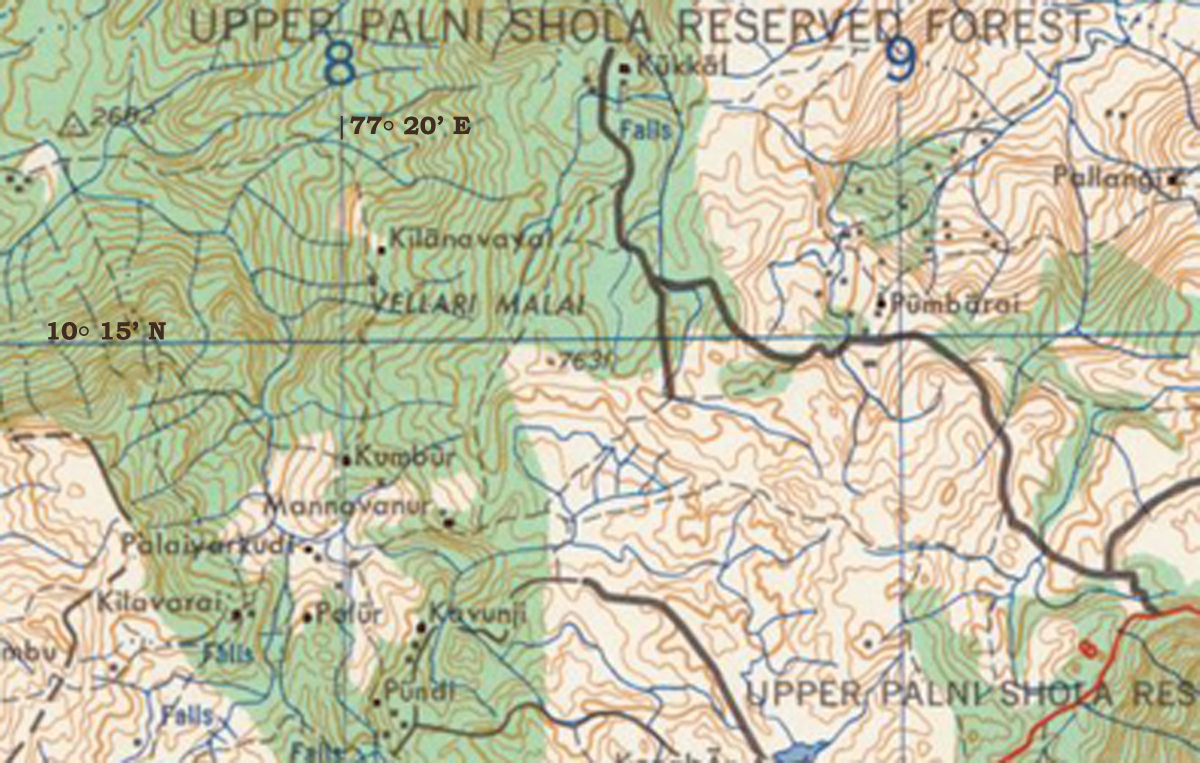
Map of Upper Palani Reserve Forest area where the elephant corridors are proposed

- Threatened mammals including bison, Nilgiri langur, Malabar giant squirrels and Indian elephants are seen here as well as Indian crested porcupines, wild boar, barking deer, sambar deer and mouse deer.

In February 2010, tigers were sighted in Kodaikanal forests during a six-day carnivore survey. A tigress and her cub were spotted playing in the wild. Forest Department officials are studying survey data to estimate the local tiger population based on indirect evidence like pug marks, scats and scratches.

Of the two wildlife corridors proposed for movement of Indian elephants in the Palani Hills Reserve Forest, the Berijam corridor connects to Top Station in Kerala. It is also being studied if a link corridor through the Kukkal area, could be established to the second corridor from Indira Gandhi Wildlife Sanctuary and National Park through Amaravathy and Kudhiraiyar to the Palar Dam, then up the valley almost to Ganesh Nagar, below Pethuparai village.

Fish

In 1886 there were carp in the lake. In 1914 there was a scheme to introduce trout into Berijam reservoir.

== Conservation ==
Threats

The catchment basin of the lake, historically dominated by extensive shola grass lands, drains into marshes at the head of the lake. However, most of the catchment area was afforested, during the 1960s, with eucalyptus, wattle and pine. The main Berijam marsh has shrunk, as evidenced in March 2007, by walking across the marsh without getting one's feet wet. This is attributed to less water discharging into the lake. Shrinking of the lake has also been noticed with the boating dock getting shifted to deeper waters on the opposite side of the creek.

The creek waters adjoining the marsh have been gradually invaded by marshland vegetation of water lilies, torpedo grass and native sedges with shoots in water and roots at the nodes. The water lilies were planted there "reportedly" for ornamental purposes by the Forest Department. These marshland invasives are accelerating the siltation process and may eventually result in necessity of raising the height of the dam to compensate for loss of storage due to siltation.

A crisis in the water regime of the Palani plateau has been observed at Berijam Lake. The lake's marshlands have been reported to dry out after the monsoon and marsh vegetation is seen encroaching into the deeper part of the lake.

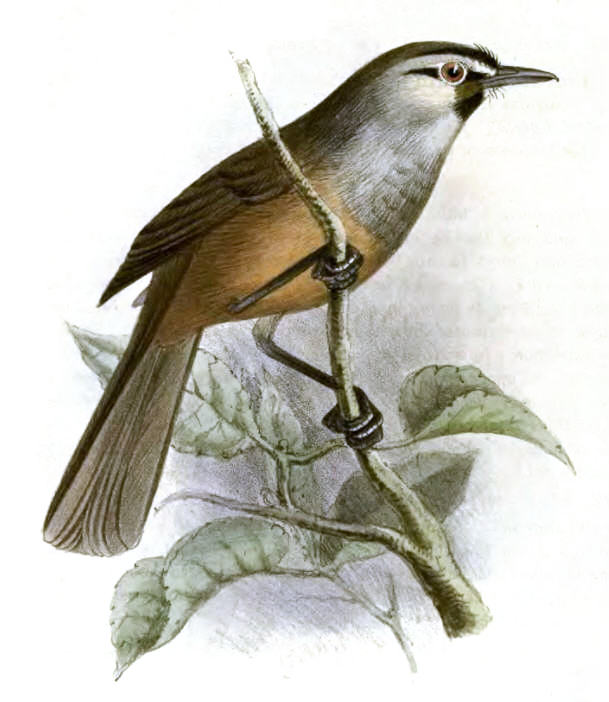
Near threatened grey-breasted laughingthrush

Studies by the Sálim Ali Centre for Ornithology and Natural History, Coimbatore, undertaken in 2006 in many areas of the Palani hills including Berijam, indicate that the population of the grey-breasted laughingthrush, a near threatened endemic bird species of the Western Ghats, has been affected by the degradation of its habitat. Remedial measures have been suggested.

Otter poaching in the Palani hills to the point of extermination has been reported. Common and small-clawed otters are trapped by tribals from the Haryana state of India, who are in Palani hills with the sole aim of collecting otter oil which is in demand in northern India.

Mercury pollution was reported in Kodaikanal which affected lakes in the area.

The causes, originating from a Hindustan Lever thermometer factory nearby, were reported to be dispersal of elemental mercury to the atmosphere from improper storage and dispersal from surface effluents from the factory. Apart from tests conducted on Kodaikanal lake, moss samples collected from trees surrounding the Berijam Lake, located 20 km (12.4 mi) from the factory were also tested. These showed mercury level in the range of 0.2 μg/kg.

In 1902, important bauxite deposits were discovered in the hills north and south of Berijam Lake which The Geological Survey of India investigated during 1964–65.

Remedial measures

The following measures have been suggested or are under implementation by various agencies.

- Plastics, smoking and consuming alcohol are prohibited at the lake area.
- Promote Shola grass land afforestation in the catchment area of the lake, particularly towards Mannavanur where its absence is noticed. This remedial measure could be ecologically and biologically beneficial to restore the lake's water source.
- Grassland rehabilitation could be achieved, with NGO and community participation.

The Vatakanal Conservation Trust, a non-governmental organization in association with the Tamil Nadu Forest Department has initiated efforts to restore the shola system. A pilot project was undertaken to protect the Pambar shola, adjacent to Kodaikanal.

- Kurinji saplings associated with Shola grasslands and other native grasslands species have been successfully nurtured.
- Excellent flowering of krunji flowers on the cliffs near Berijam Lake have been noted during August and September.

Noting the effect on the breeding of the grey–breasted laughingthrush, the Sálim Ali Centre for Ornithology and Natural History has recommended:

- Expansion of plantations and restoration of grasslands and shola forests in the Palani hills should be halted
- The larger shola forests of Kukkal and Mathikettan (Berijam) to be declared as bird sanctuaries with better protection for the proposed Palani Hills Wildlife Sanctuary and National Park.
- Set up a GIS database with thematic details, including information on flora and fauna, to help monitor the globally near threatened species.
- Initiate a nature education programme to highlight importance of natural vegetation in Habitat conservation of biodiversity and watershed management of Palani Hills.

== Gallery ==
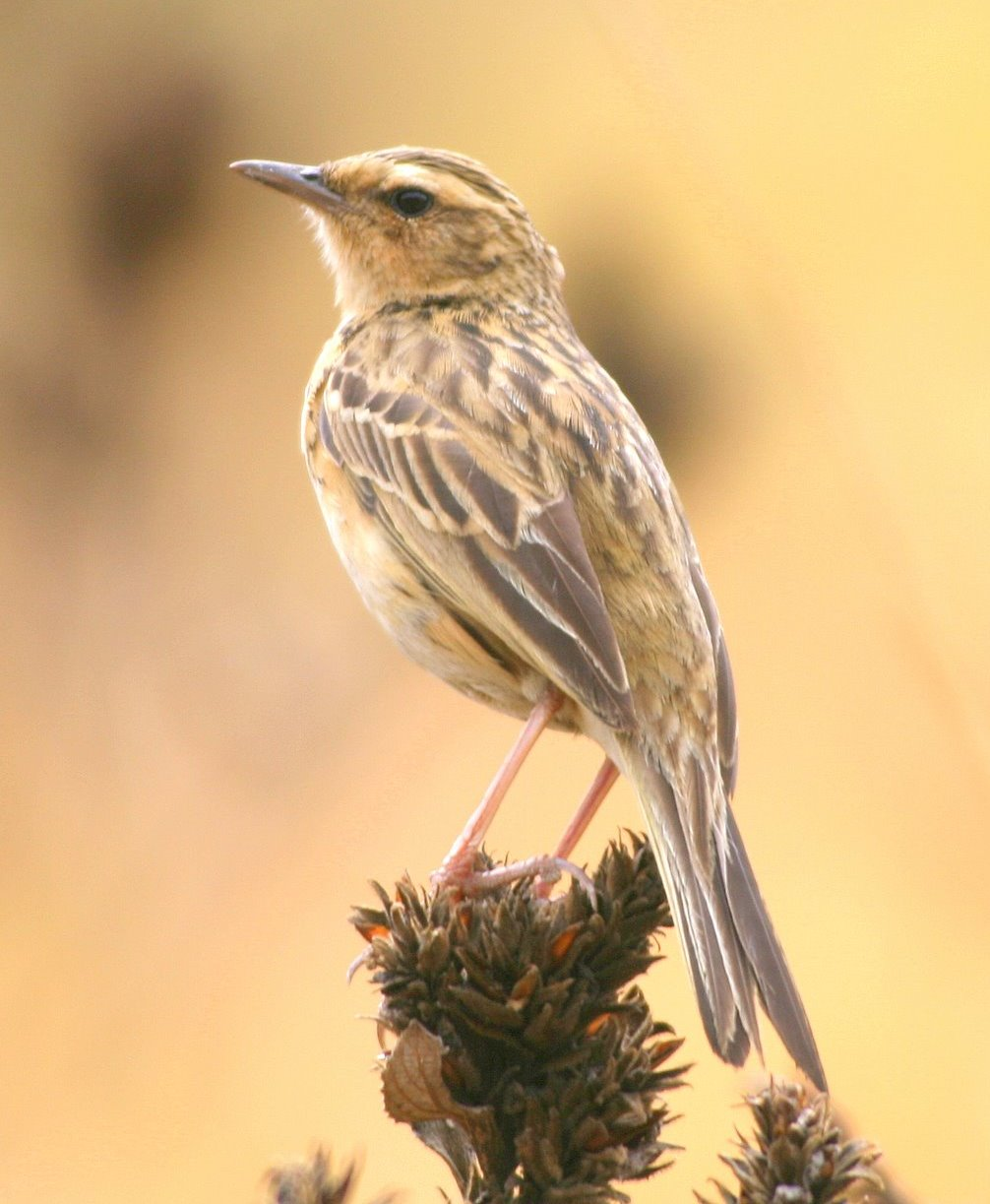
The Nilgiri pipit (Anthus nilghiriensis), a near threatened bird species

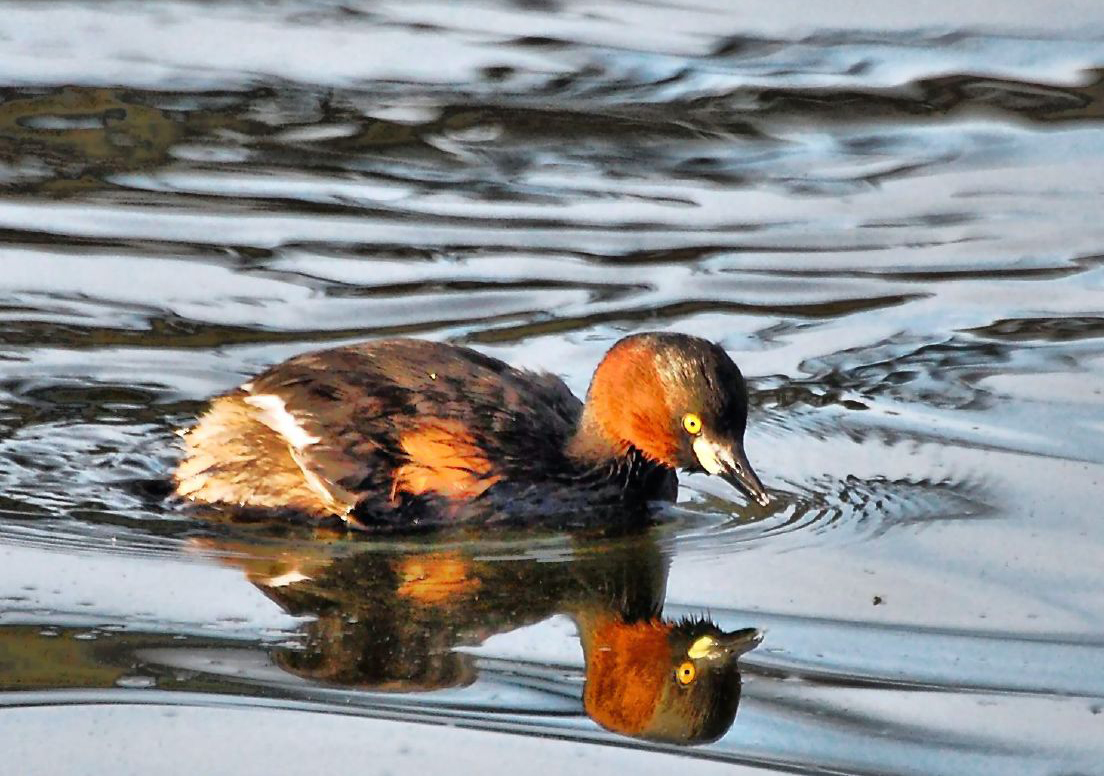
Little grebe in the lake

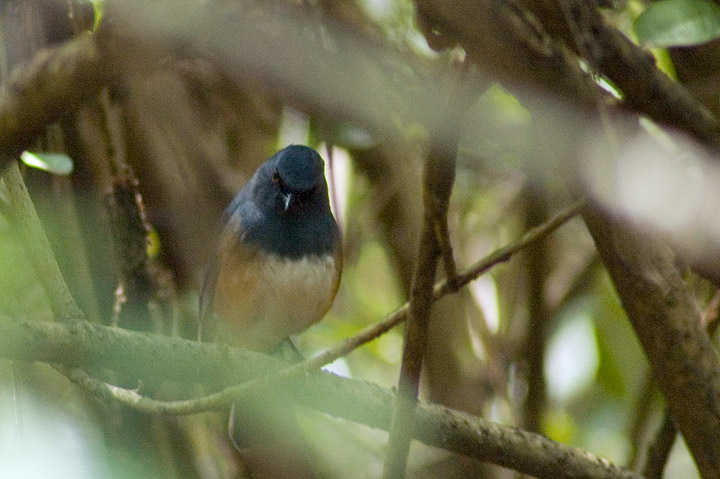
The white-bellied shortwing (Brachypteryx major)

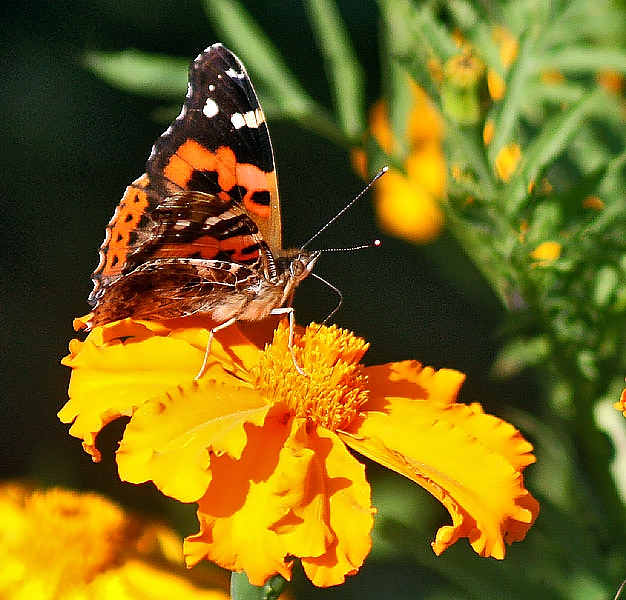
Vanessa indica, butterfly

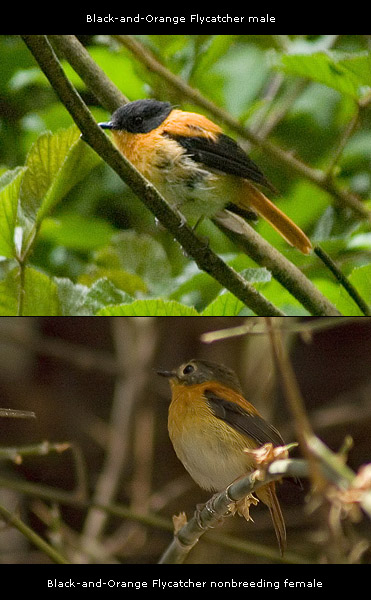
Black-and-orange flycatcher, male and non-breeding female

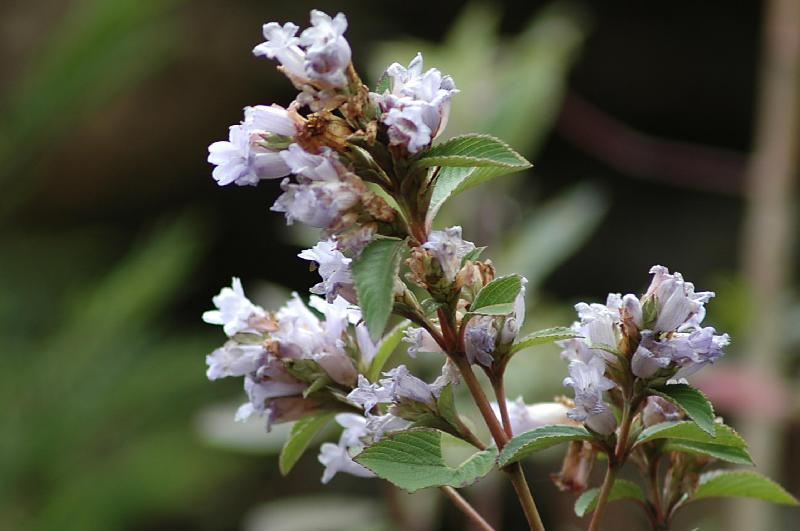
Kurunji flower in mountain peak of Berijam lake

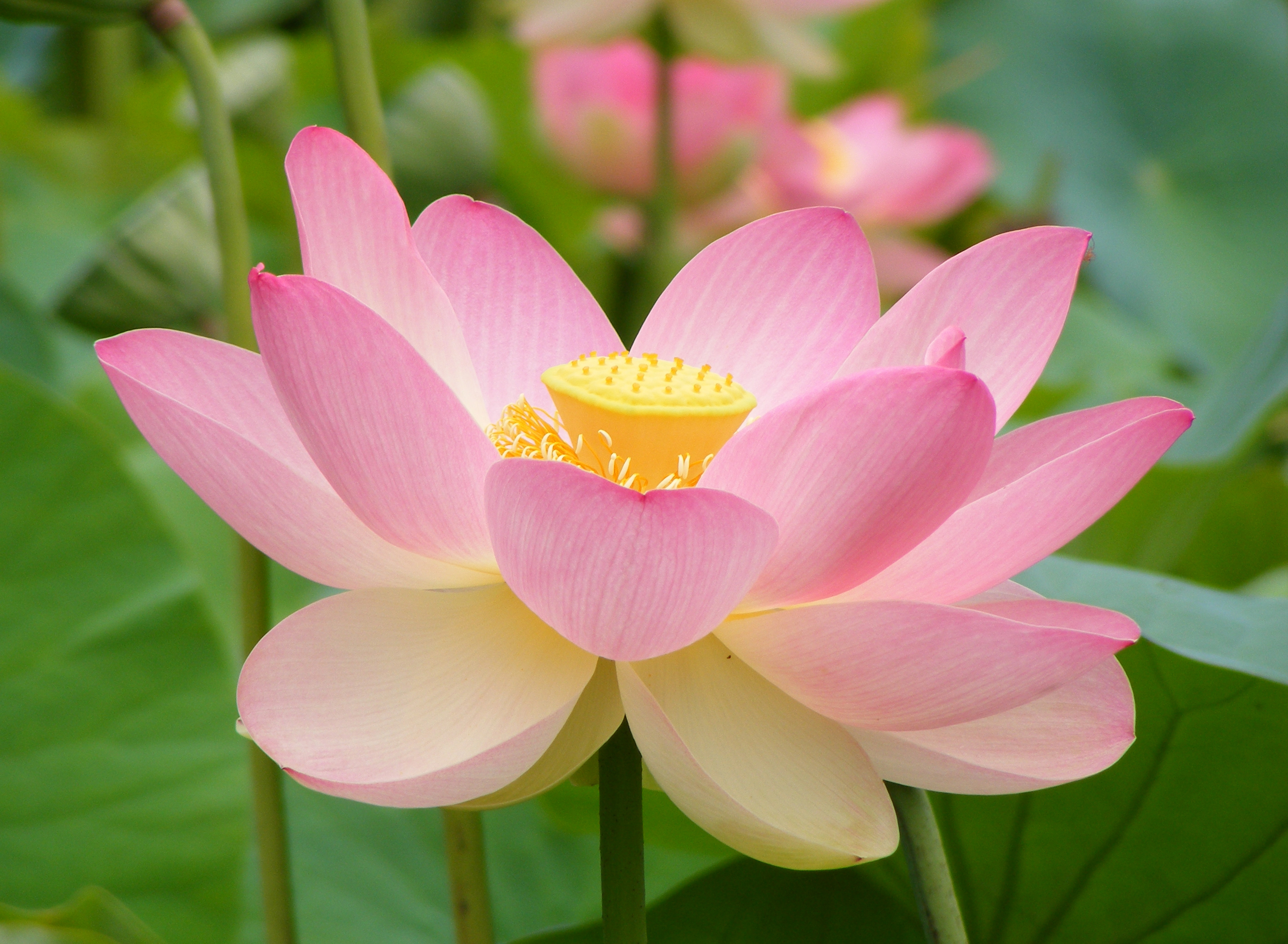
The national flower of India, Nelumbo nucifera introduced into the lake

== External sources ==
- Satellite view of Berijam Lake
- Photo of Berijam entrance gate from Munnar road
