= Kadavari =

Village in Kerala, India

- Village
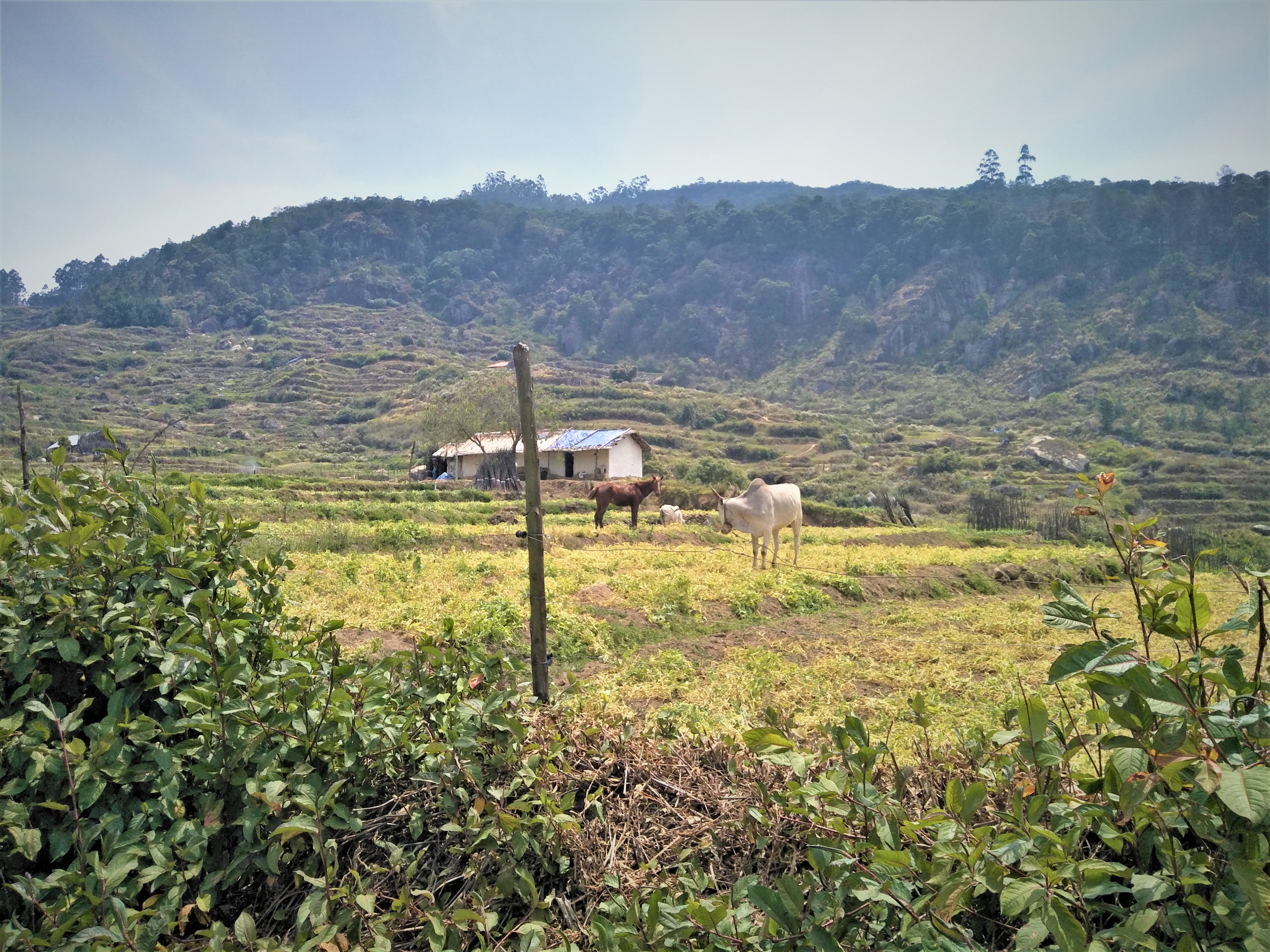
- Farmlands of Kadavari
- Interactive map of Kadavari
- Location in Kerala Kadavari (India)
- Coordinates: 10°12′57″N 77°17′8″E
- Country: India
- State: Kerala
- District: Idukki
- Taluk: Devikulam

Government
  - Type: Panchayat
  - Body: Vattavada Panchayat
- Elevation: 2,000 m (6,600 ft)

Languages
  - Official: Malayalam; English
  - Regional: Malayalam; Tamil
- Time zone: UTC+5:30 (IST)
- PIN code: 685615
- STD code: 04865
- Vehicle registration: KL-68 (Devikulam Sub RTO)
- Nearest towns: Munnar (51 km); Kodaikanal (55 km)

Kadavari is a village in the Vattavada panchayat of Devikulam taluk in Idukki district in Kerala, India. It is located close to the Tamil Nadu border at an elevation of around 2,000 m (6,600 ft) above sea level. The village is situated inside the Kurinjimala Sanctuary, a protected area for the Neelakurinji plant.

== Location ==
Kadavari is located at a distance of 5 km (3.1 mi) from the border village of Kilavarai in Tamil Nadu, 3.5 km (2.2 mi) from Kottakamboor, 7.5 km (4.7 mi) from Koviloor, 51 km (32 mi) from Munnar, and 55 km (34 mi) from Kodaikanal. It is located on the route that runs parallel to the Kodaikanal - Munnar road, also known as Escape Road.

== Economy ==
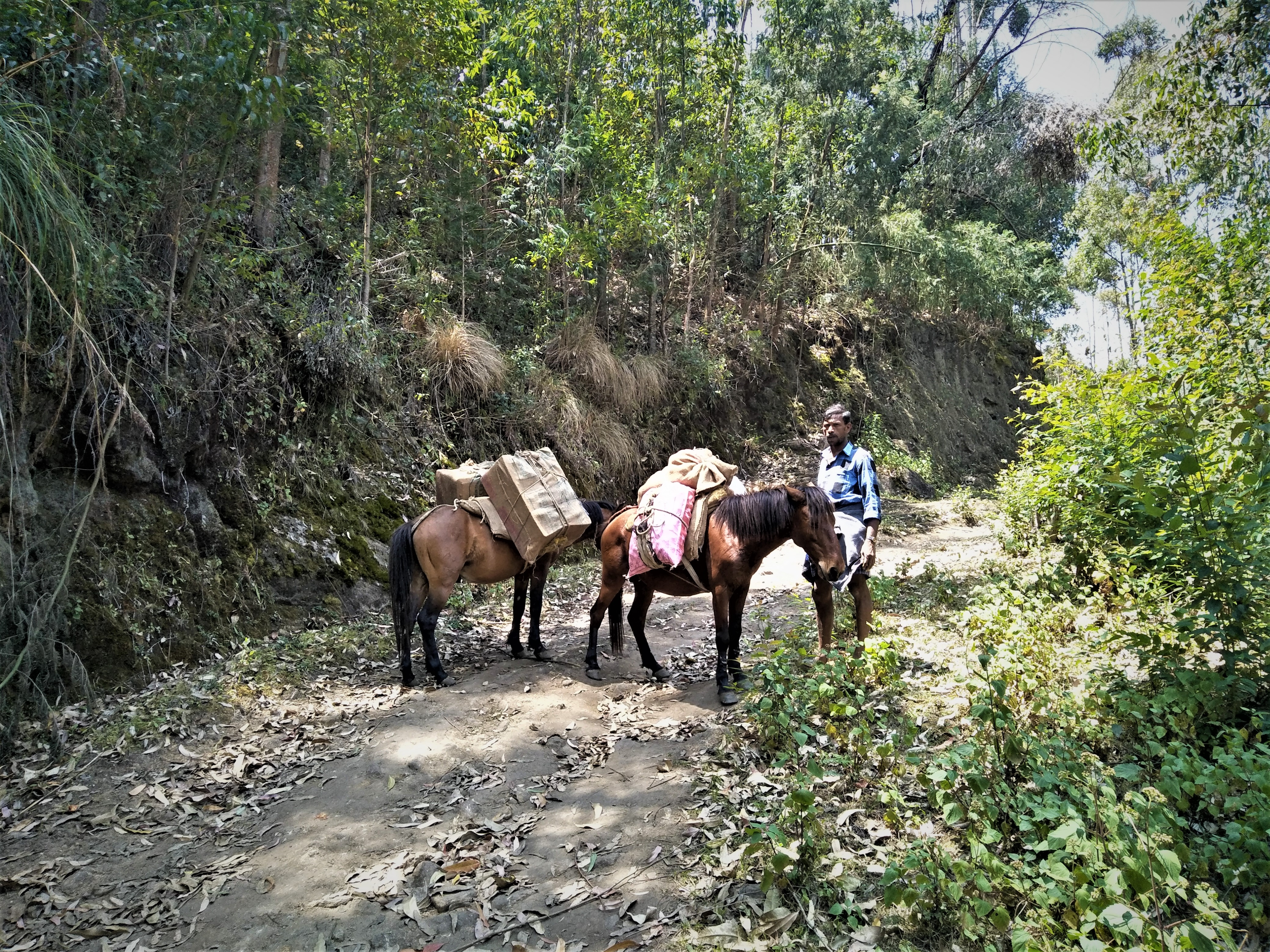
A farmer carrying vegetables on horseback through Kadavari - Kilavarai horse trail

Agriculture is the primary source of income for the people here. Beans, potatoes, carrots, beetroot, cabbage, garlic, radishes, and other vegetables are cultivated in the farms. Vegetables grown here are mostly taken to Tamil Nadu for sale. Farmers transport their produce on horseback through the rugged road to Kilavarai in Tamil Nadu.
