= Ganguvarpatti =

Ganguvarpatti Genguvarpatti
- Village
- Nickname: Gengai
- Location in Tamil Nadu, India
- Coordinates: 10°10′07″N 77°41′34″E
- Country: India
- State: Tamil Nadu
- District: Theni
- Zone: Madurai

Population (2001)
  - Total: 10,569

Languages
  - Official: Tamil
- Time zone: UTC+5:30 (IST)

Genguvarpatti is a Panchayath town in Periyakulam Taluk of Theni district Tamil Nadu, india

== Population ==
According to the 2001 census, Genguvarpatti had a population of 10,569. Males constitute 51% of the population while females constitute the other 49%. Genguvarpatti has an average literacy rate of 57%, lower than the national average of 59.5%; male literacy is 67%, and female literacy is 47%. 13% of the population is under 6.

== Climate ==
During the Southwest monsoon, the village receives the majority of its rainfall.

== Economy ==
The Manjalar crosses this village. This water and monsoon rain is used to cultivate crops throughout the year.

Agriculture is the backbone of the town; most of the residents cultivate paddy, sugarcane, cotton, etc.
