= Kavunji =

Kavunji (Mannavanur Panchayat) is a Panchayat village of terrace farmers at the far western end of the Western Ghats in Kodaikanal block of Dindigul district, Tamil Nadu state, South India, Pincode 624103. It is 35 kilometres (22 mi) from Kodaikanal at: 10°12′26″N 77°20′25″E. Elevation is 1,920 metres (6,300 ft). Kavunji is notable as a vegetable farming area.

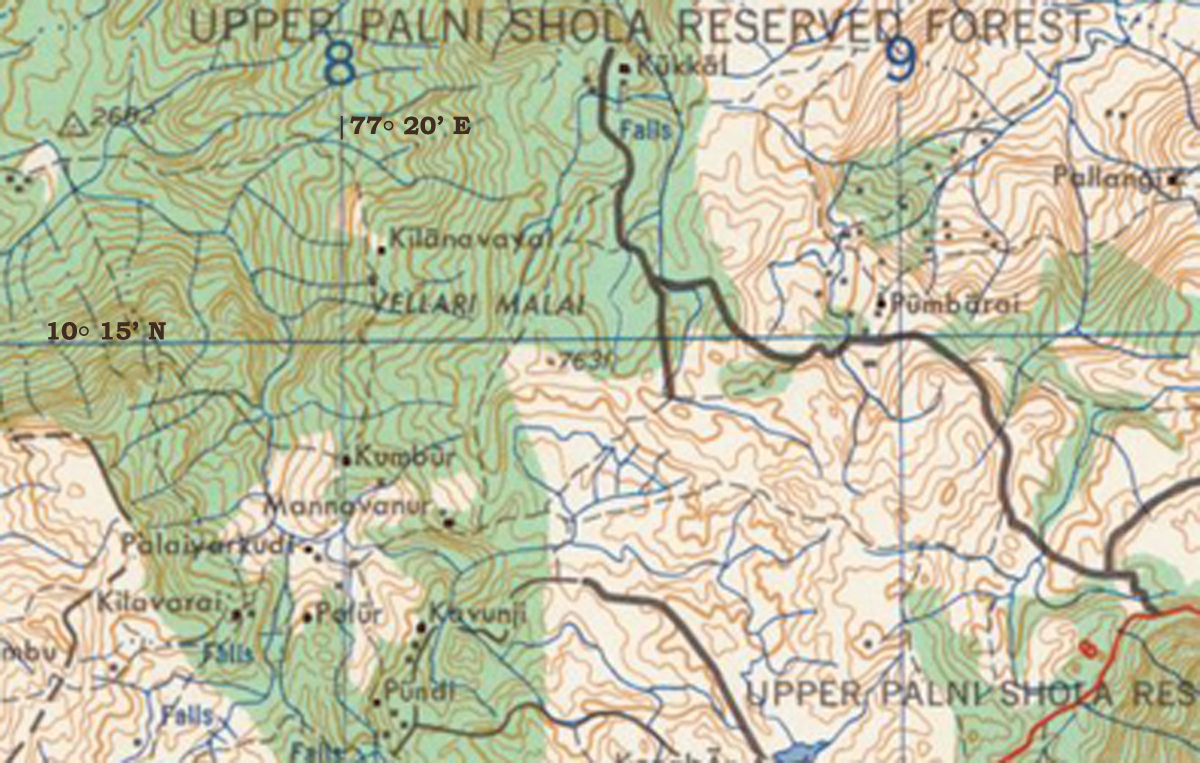
Upper Palani Reserve Forest showing Kavunji

== History ==
There is a Tamil language inscription on a stone in the street believed to be dated in S.S. 1013 (CE 1091). The people of Kavunji believe that the inscription relates details and results of a controversy. The inscription measures 4 by 3 feet (1.22 by 0.91 m).

== Drinking water facility ==
BalaCares Foundation Donated Drinking Water facilities to this village on 1999 with individual pipe connection for each and every street in kavunji village.

== Health ==
During 1998, the Sri Bala Medical Centre was opened by the Bala Care Foundation.

== Education ==
There is a Primary School, Panchayat Union Middle School and Government High School in Kavunji. Now kavunji also having higher secondary.
