= Chinnamuthu Mudaliar =

Indian nationalist from Tamil Nadu

- Born: 13 February 1891; Papparappatti, Madras Presidency, British India
- Died: 30 April 1950 (aged 59)

Chinnamuthu Mudaliar (13 February 1891 – 30 April 1950) was an Indian nationalist and participant in the Indian independence movement from Tamil Nadu.

== Early life ==
Chinnamuthu Mudaliar was born on 13 February 1891 in Papparappatti, Madras Presidency, British India. His father, Muthukuppa Mudaliar, was a landowner.

Chinnamuthu became involved in the Indian independence movement in 1914. He was a close associate of Subramania Siva, another freedom fighter from Tamil Nadu. Chinnamuthu joined the Sadananda Sabha, a nationalist organization founded by Siva in 1915.

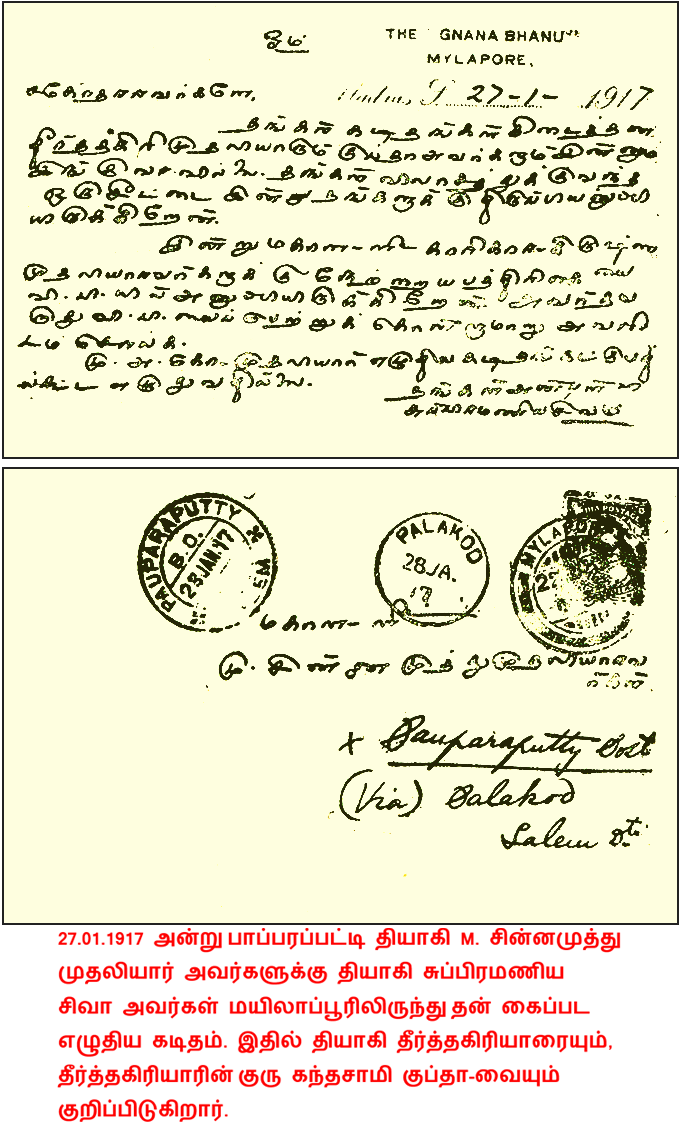
Letter written by Subramaniya Siva to Chinnamuthu

He collaborated with Siva to establish a Bharat Mata Temple as a symbol of India's liberation. Chinnamuthu secured six acres of land in Papparappatti for the project and invited C. R. Das to lay its foundation stone on 23 January 1923. The site was named Bharatpuram. Construction efforts, however, ceased following Subramania Siva's death in 1925.

Chinnamuthu participated in several key events of the freedom struggle, including the Neil Statue Satyagraha in Madras in 1927, protests against toddy shops and foreign goods, the Civil Disobedience Movement in 1932, and the Quit India Movement in 1942, which led to his arrest and imprisonment.

In addition to his political activities, Chinnamuthu also contributed to nationalist literature by translating V. D. Savarkar's work into Tamil under the title Erimalai.

Chinnamuthu Mudaliar died on 30 April 1950.
