= Thalaiyar Falls =

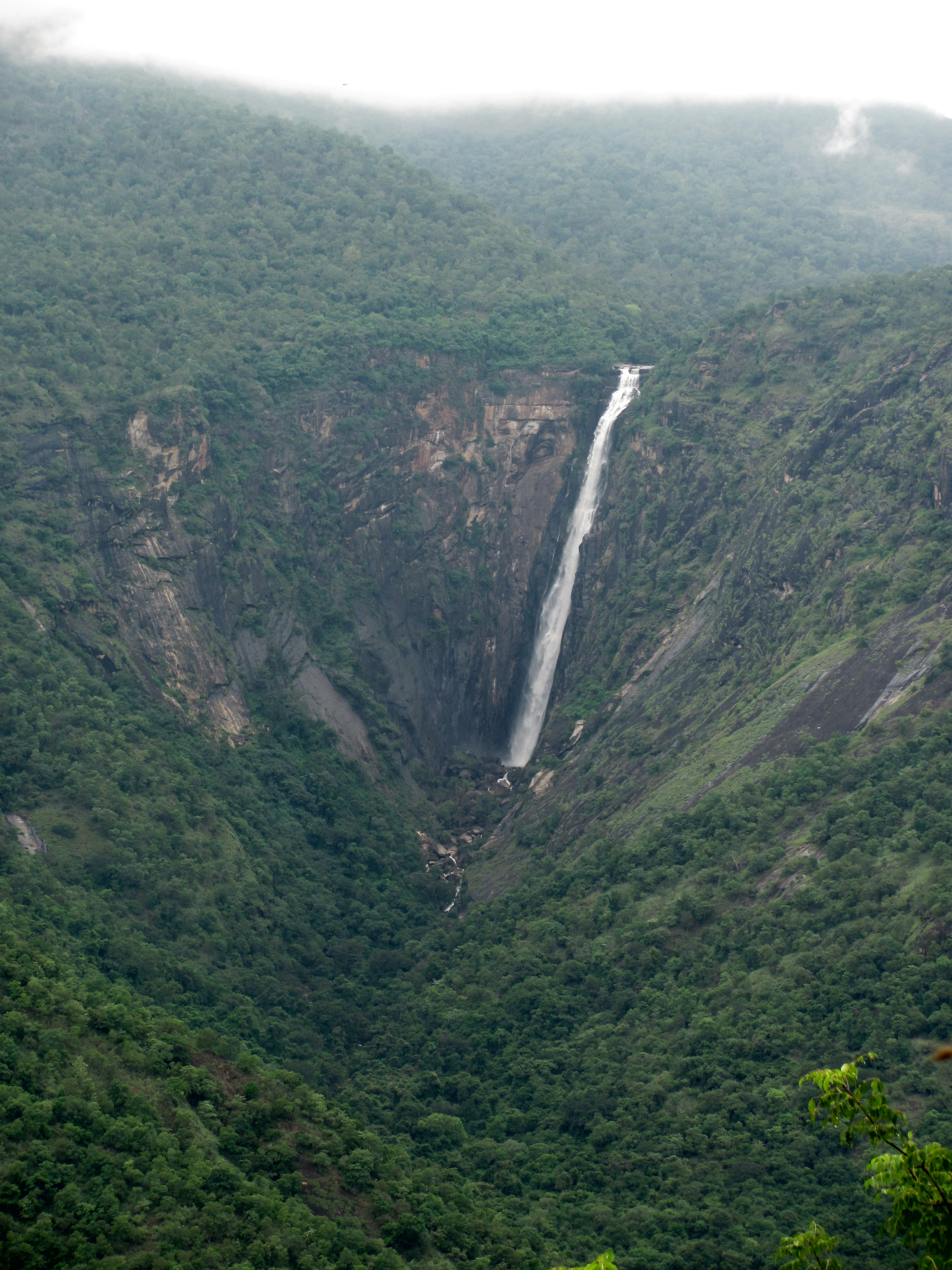
- Rat Tail Falls
- Interactive map of Thalaiyar Falls
- Location: Palani Hills
- Coordinates: 10°13′25″N 77°35′54″E
- Type: Horsetail
- Elevation: 820 metres (2,690 ft)
- Total height: 297 m (974 ft)
- Number of drops: single
- Watercourse: Manjalar River
- World height ranking: 267, India: #3

Thalaiyar Falls, also known as Rat Tail Falls or Eli Vaal Aruvi, is a waterfall in Dindigul District, located on the Manjalar River, one of the tributaries of Vaigai river which flows in the south of Tamil Nadu State, South India. It is 297 m (974 ft) tall and is the highest waterfall in Tamil Nadu, the eighth highest waterfall in India and the 267th highest in the world.

== Description ==
On a clear day Rat Tail Falls is visible from the Dum Dum Rock viewpoint on the Batalugundu-Kodaikanal Ghat Road, 3.6 kilometres (2.2 mi) away to the west. It appears across the valley as a long thin white strip of cascading water on a background of black rock cliff face that juts out of the foothills.

The very edge at the top of the Falls has a low concrete wall on either side concentrating the flow of water to focus the falls into a better rat tail shape. One can walk along the wall and get near the center of the falls. Just below one wall is a large flat rock about 1.5 m (4 ft 11 in) wide. One can get down to the edge of the rock to look directly straight down to see a little river at the bottom continuing placidly through the forest. Looking back up to the side, one can watch the water in freefall, mostly silent. The noise of the crashing water below doesn't rise up. The only noise is the water pushing around the stone walls, and some smaller falls just upstream.

The river water coming to the falls, though 9 km (5.6 mi) downstream from Perumal Malai village and apparently clear, may be polluted, and visitors to the area are advised to avoid drinking it.

== Access ==
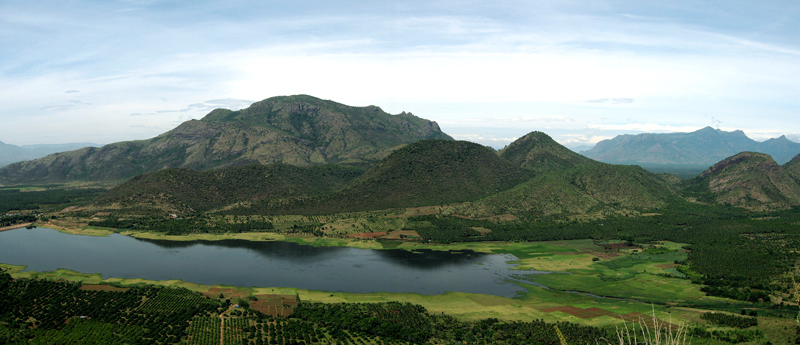
Manjalar Dam (left) Manjalar Reservoir- 2.1 kilometres (1.3 mi) long (center) Manjalar River (right). Thalaiyar Falls are 2.8 kilometres (1.7 mi) more to the right.

Rat Tail Falls is considered inaccessible to the general public, as there is no road to it. The top of the falls is a rewarding and challenging hike destination. Hikers should be cautious, as two Western tourists died in 2006 when they fell from the top of the Falls.

It is possible to hike to the bottom of the falls in the dry season, beginning at the Manjalar Dam. This difficult hike proceeds along a path through Mango orchards and potato fields around the Manjalar Reservoir and up along the stream as far as a small shrine, dedicated to the Goddess Kamakshi. The legend is that Kamakshi was born here at the foot of the falls in a bamboo bush and hence she is called Moonkilanai Kamakshi. This place is called Amma Machhu, meaning in the middle of a grove of teak trees.

Beyond this point one must climb up along the stream, going up, over and around increasingly large boulders with difficulty, till arriving at the bottom of the falls, where there is a pool about 30 metres (98 ft) by 60 metres (200 ft). The return hike is more difficult. The full hike there and back covers about 15 kilometres (9.3 mi) and takes a full day.

Manjalar Dam is at the end of Manjalar Road about 5.5 kilometres (3.4 mi) north from SH-36 at Devadanapatti town beginning along Kamatchi Amman temple road.

== See also ==
- List of waterfalls
- List of waterfalls in India

== External sources ==
- Top of the falls (part of Rattail Falls gallery)
- Base of the falls - 1, Photos
- Base of the falls - 2, Photo

== See also ==
- Waterfalls in Palani Hills Wildlife Sanctuary and National Park
- List of waterfalls in India
- List of waterfalls in India by height
