= Papparapatti =

Papparapatti may refer to:

- Papparapatti, Dharmapuri
- Papparapatti, Salem
