= Panthapuli =

Village in Tamil Nadu, India

Panthapuli is a village located near to Sankarankovil in Tenkasi district of Tamil Nadu, India. It is located on Tirunelveli-Rajapalayam Highway.The village became notable during the temple entry protest happened in late 2008.

== Temple entry conflict ==
Kannanallur Mariamman temple located in the village was closed for entry to everyone till December 2008 due to conflicts between Dalits and non-Dalits. Communist Party of India (Marxist) had announced temple entry with Dalits on 17 December 2008 which led to the vacation of about 400 non-Dalits leaving the village and settling down in nearby hillock.

Dalits were not allowed to enter the temple despite a ruling by a district court in favour of them. Consequently, Dalits left their village and settled down in the foot hills near to the village. Upon a Government order issued by Chief minister M. Karunanidhi, on 25 December 2008, Dalits led by the district collector G Prakash and Superintendent of Police Asra Garg entered the temple despite the protest and resentment of non-Dalits, following which it is to remain open and poojas be performed on a regular basis by all.

== See also ==
- Temple Entry Proclamation
- Vaikom Satyagraha
