= Manjalar River =

River in Tamil Nadu, India

Coordinates: 11°05′N 79°47′E

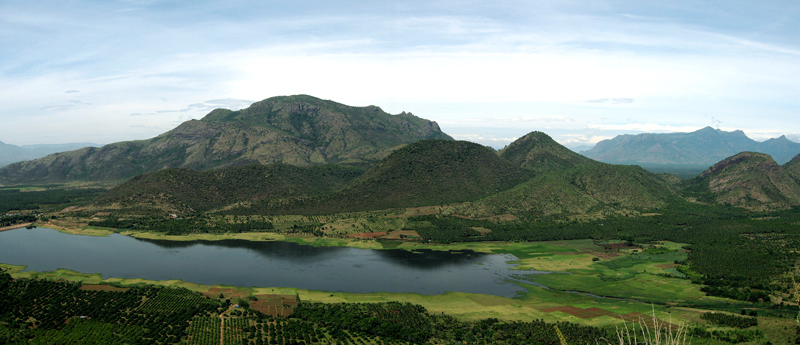
The Manjal Aru dam located in the Palani Hills, Tamil Nadu

Manjalar originates from Palani Hills, Tamil Nadu and runs towards east and joins the Vaigai River near Koottathu. There are nine anicuts and nine tanks in this sub-basin. It receives an annual rainfall of 775 millimetres (30.5 in). The total sub-basin area is 470 square kilometres (180 sq mi). The total ayacut of the sub-basin is 2,155.53 hectares (5,326.4 acres).

The Manjalar Dam spans the river near Batlagundu.

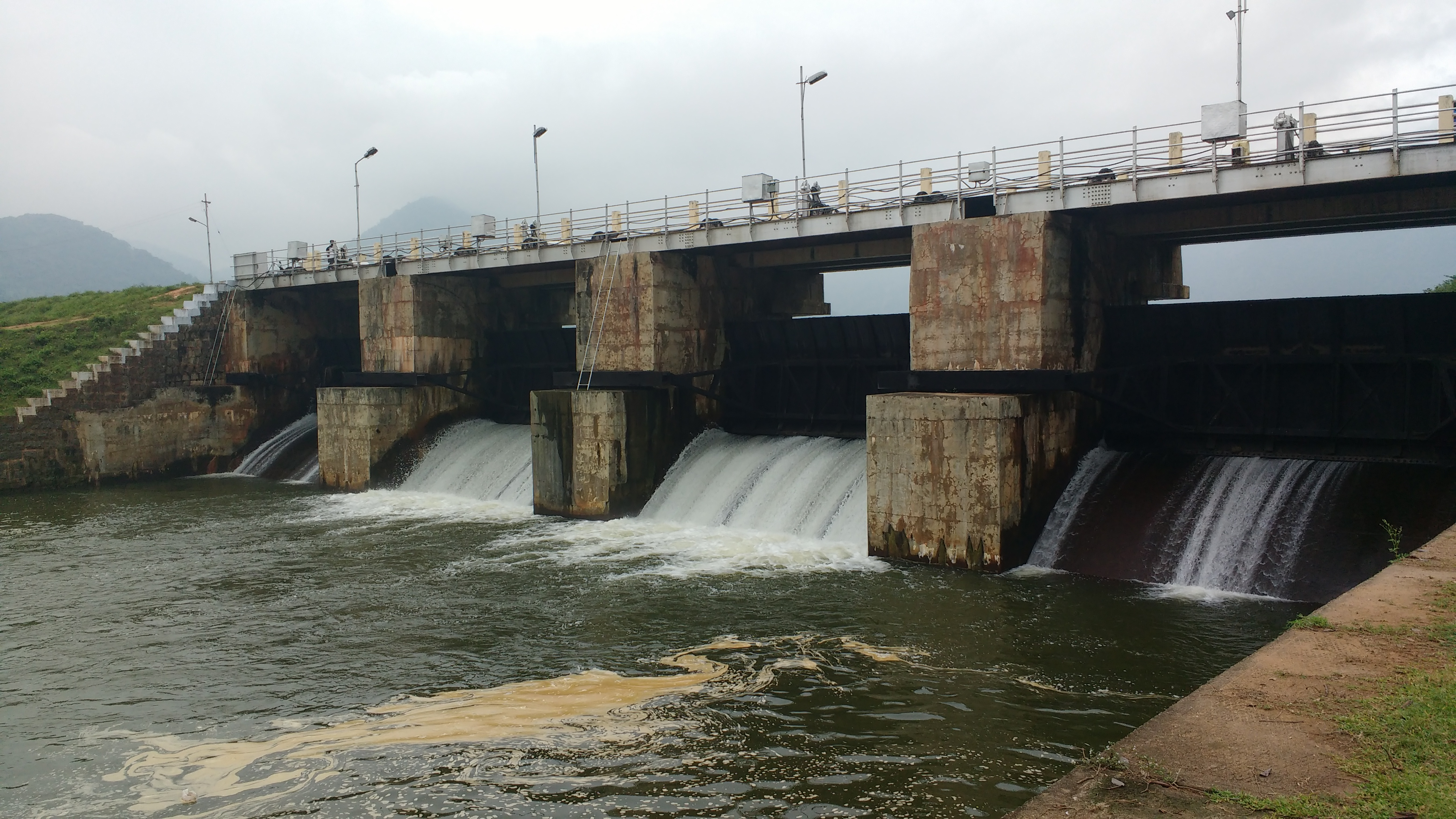
மஞ்சளாறு அணை

== See also ==
- Thalaiyar Falls
- Varaha River
