= Silver Cascade Falls =

Silver Cascade Falls may refer to:

- Silver Cascade Falls (Colorado Springs, Colorado) in USA
- Silver Cascade Falls (India) in Tamil Nadu, India.
