= State Highway 156 (Tamil Nadu) =

Road in Tamil Nadu, India

State Highway 156

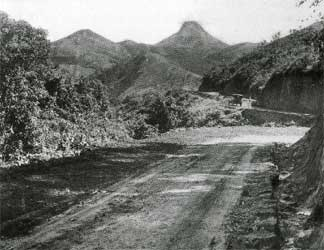
- Laws ghat road in the early 1900s

Route information
- Maintained by Highways and Minor Ports Department
- Length: 56 km (35 mi)

Major junctions
- From: Batlagundu
- To: Kodaikanal

Location
- Country: India
- State: Tamil Nadu
- Districts: Dindigul district and Theni district

Highway system
- Roads in India; Expressways; National; State; Asian; State Highways in Tamil Nadu

The Kodaikanal Ghat Road has been designated by the Tamil Nadu State Highway Department as SH-156. It begins at 10°9′10″N 77°41′30″E on the Grand Southern Trunk Road (NH-45), about 8 kilometres (5.0 mi) west of Batlagundu and ends at Kodaikanal with a length of 56.8 kilometres (35.3 mi).

The Road is tolled by the Kodaikanal Municipality.

== History ==
The road was strengthened at a cost of ₹ 60 million in 2009. A retention wall was later built due to a landslide.

The Road was used as an alternative when the Adukkam-Periakulam and Adukkam-Perumalmalai ghat roads were shut due to excessive damage.

In 2010, the road was completely blocked after a major landslide occurred due to heavy rainfall.

== Accidents ==
In 2011, four people were killed when a car plunged into a gorge.

== Gallery ==
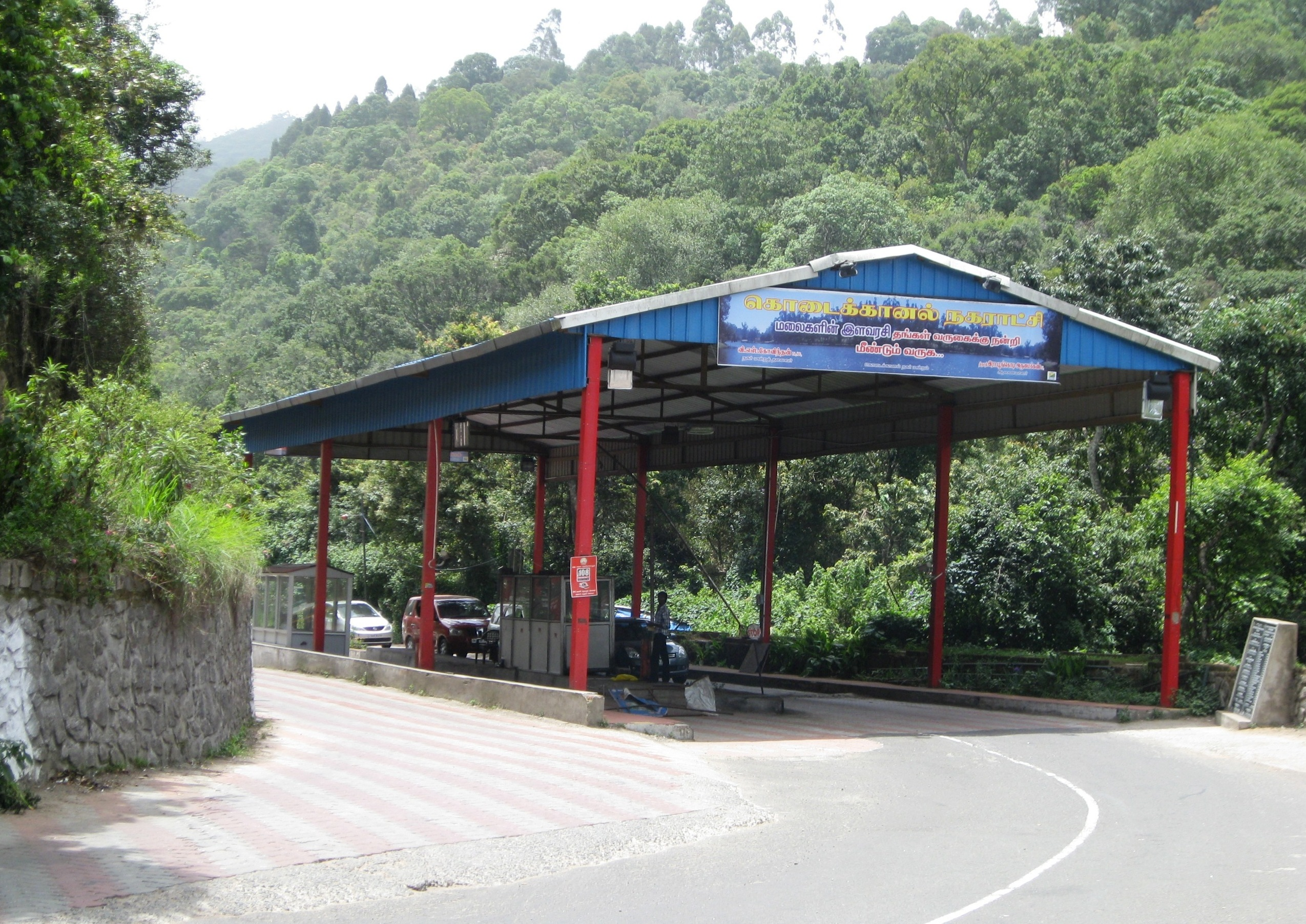
Toll gate on the SH156.

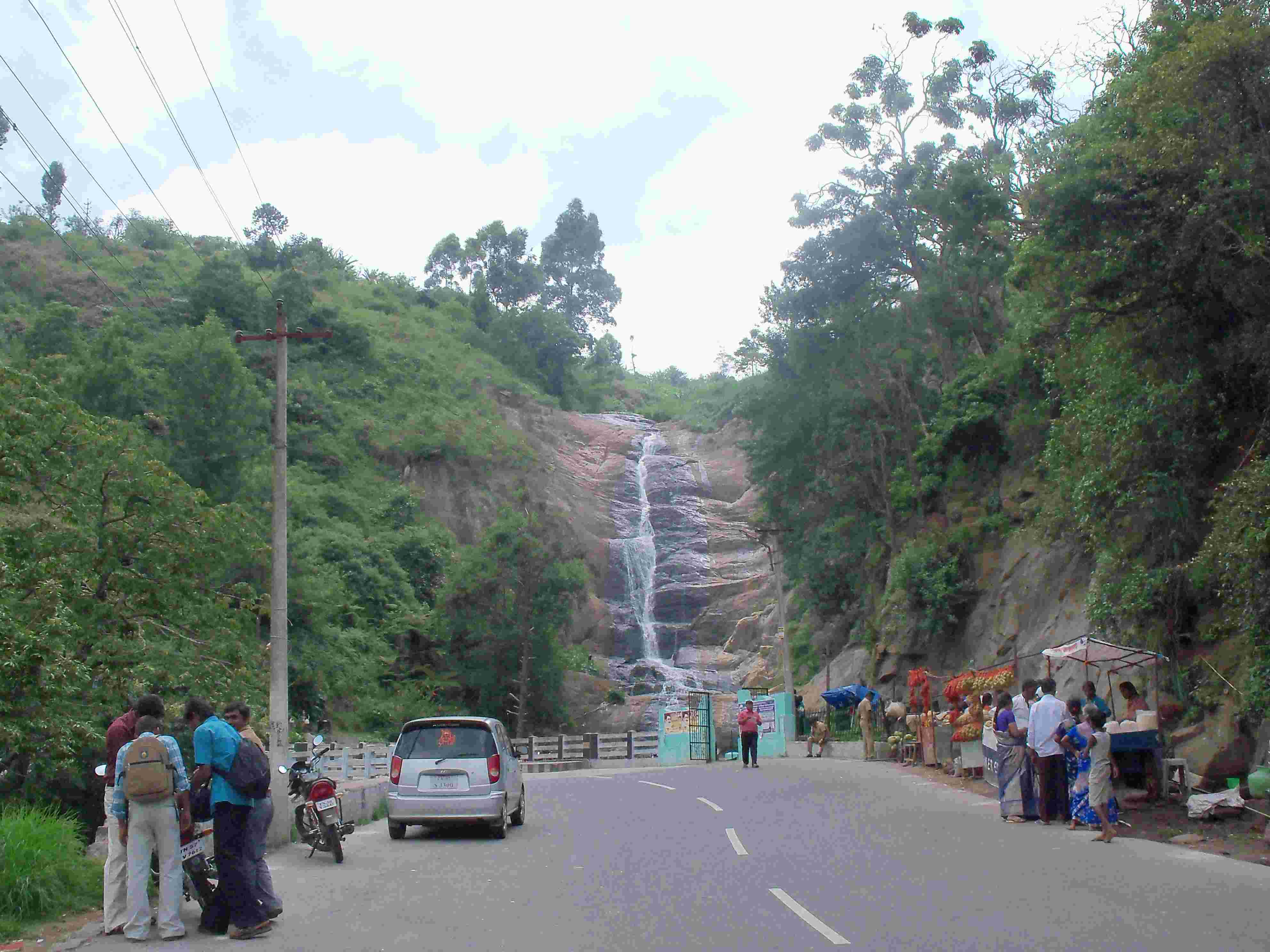
SH156 with Silver Cascade Falls.

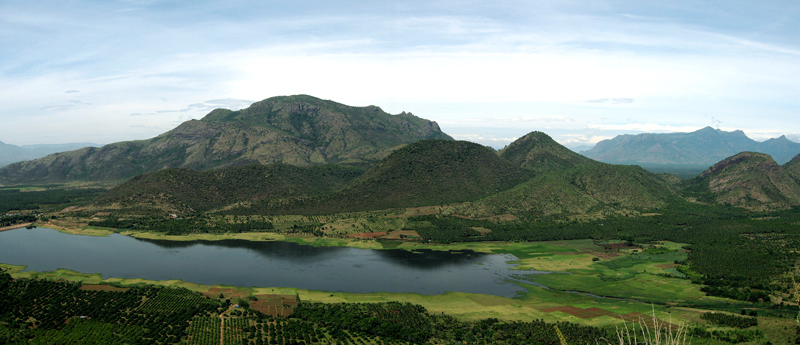
View from SH156. Manjalar Dam reservoir in the foreground.

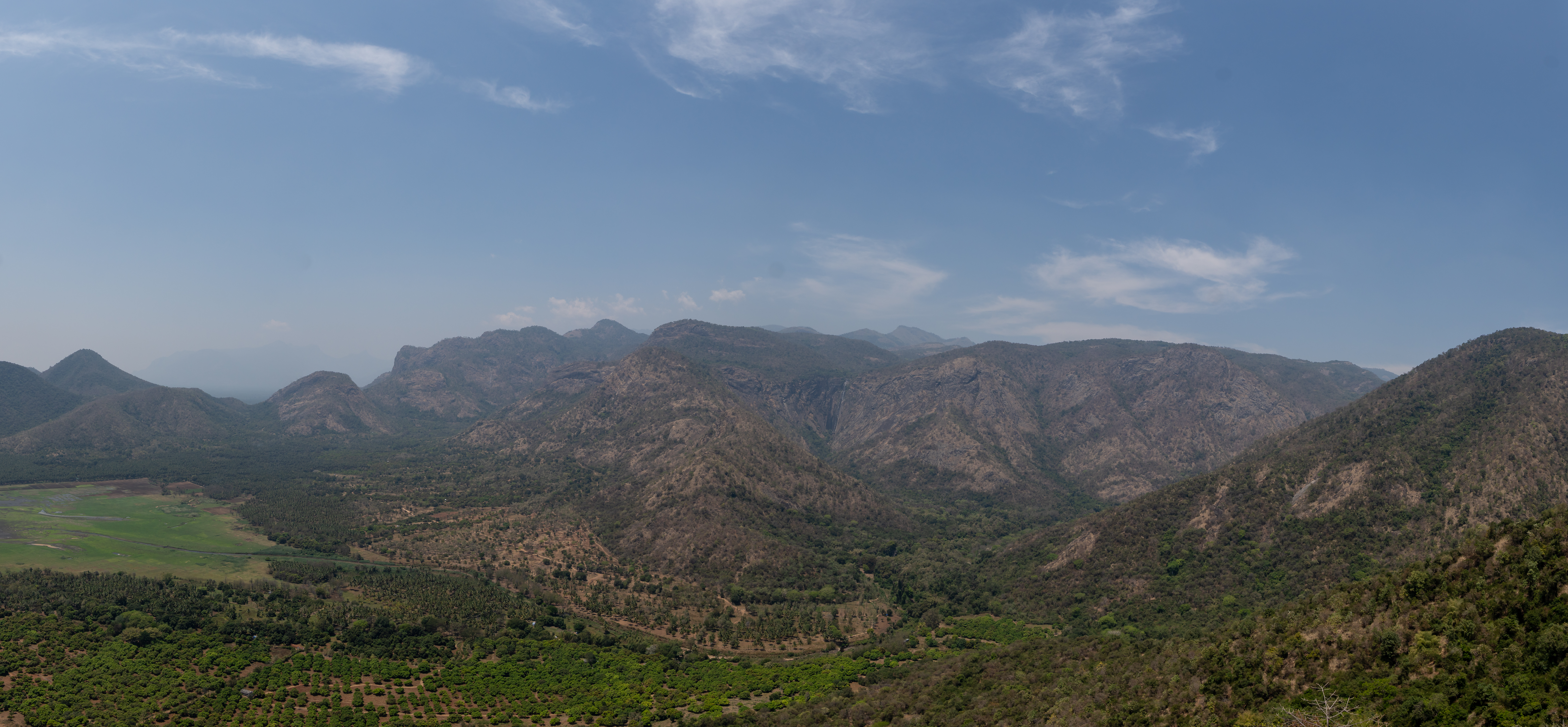
View from SH156. Thalaiyar Falls in the center.
