= Sothuparai Dam =

Dam in Tamil Nadu, India

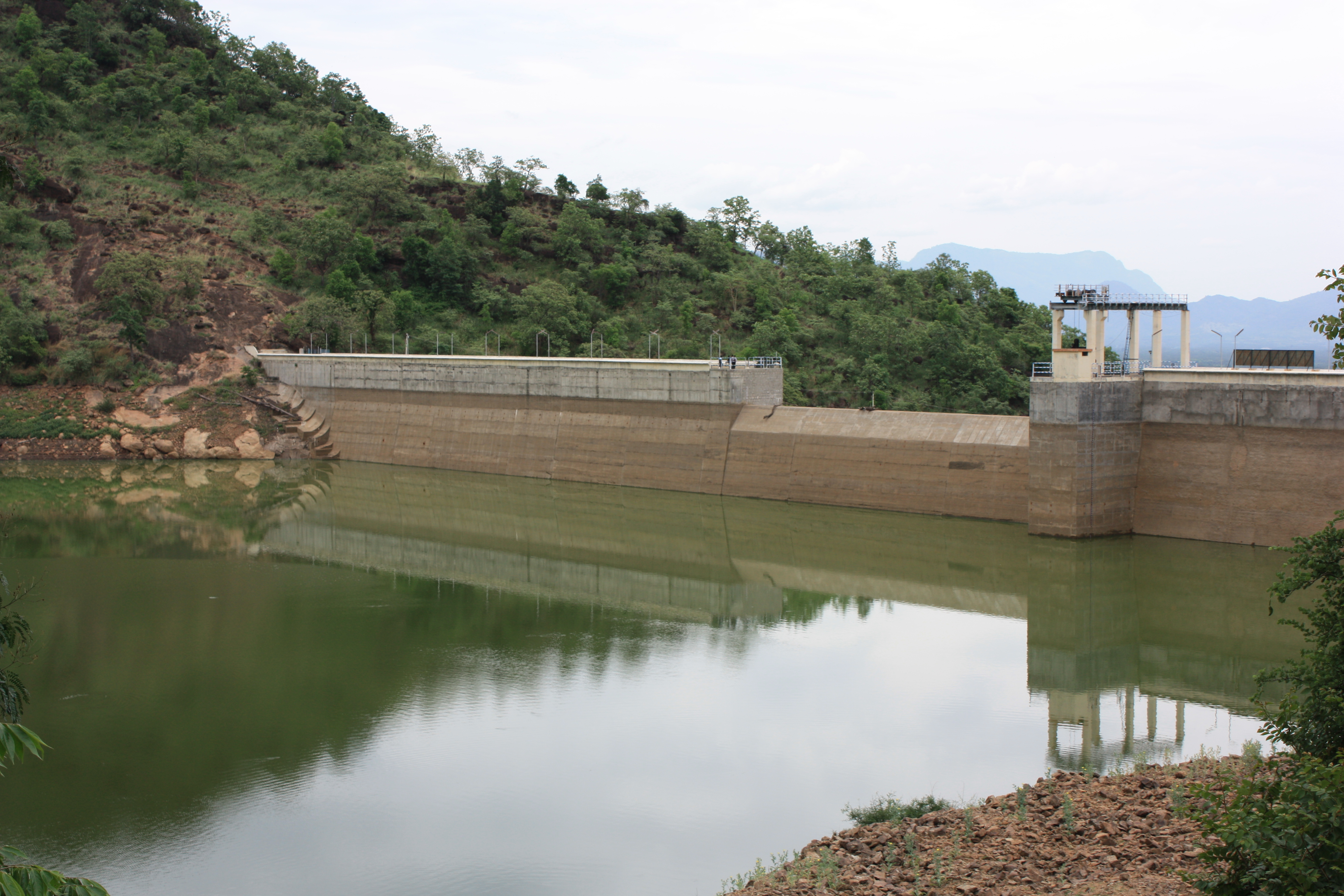
- In 2010

- Location in Tamil Nadu
- Country: India
- Location: Theni
- Coordinates: 10°07′51″N 77°27′50″E
- Status: Operational
- Owner: Tamil Nadu
- Operator: Tamil Nadu

Dam and spillways
- Impounds: Varaha River
- Height: 57 m (187 ft)

The Sothuparai Dam is a dam across the Varaha River in the Indian state of Tamil Nadu. It is located 12 km from the town of Periyakulam in Theni district.

Sothupari dam is one among the highest dams in Tamil Nadu. It is located at the backside of Periyakulam city. It is constructed across the river Varaganadhi (A tributary of River Vaigai) and located 12 km from Periyakulam. The height of the dam is 57 m. Its length is 345 m and the total catchment area is 357 Acre. The agricultural lands belonging to Thenkarai (817 Acre) and Thamaraikulam village (223 Acre) are benefitted by this Dam.

== History ==
In 1920, a proposal for constructing a dam with reservoir of 100 million cubic feet water storing capacity across the River Varaganadhi at an estimated cost of Rs. 791 lakhs was passed. Technical Sanction for a sum of Rs. 870.1 lakhs was granted to the Chief Engineer, PWD. The dam construction works were started on 20.07.1982 but got delayed due to the delay in acquisition of 14.55 hectare land from the Forest Department. The works were resumed since 1985. It was found that there were no hard rocks beneath the proposed site and so the geological department was contacted to offer clearance in this regard. The works were restarted on 1997 November and completed by M/s ECCI company on 2001. Dr. M. Karunanidhi, the then Chief Minister of Tamil Nadu paid a visit to the dam site and pace of work accelerated. The dam reached its maximum capacity and overflowed for the first time on 15.11.2001. The dam was opened in a simple function by Thiru. R. Paranthaman, Chief Engineer, PWD presided over by Thiru. Athul Anand, District Collector, Theni.

== See also ==
- Manjalar Dam
