= Manjalar Dam =

Dam in Tamil Nadu, India

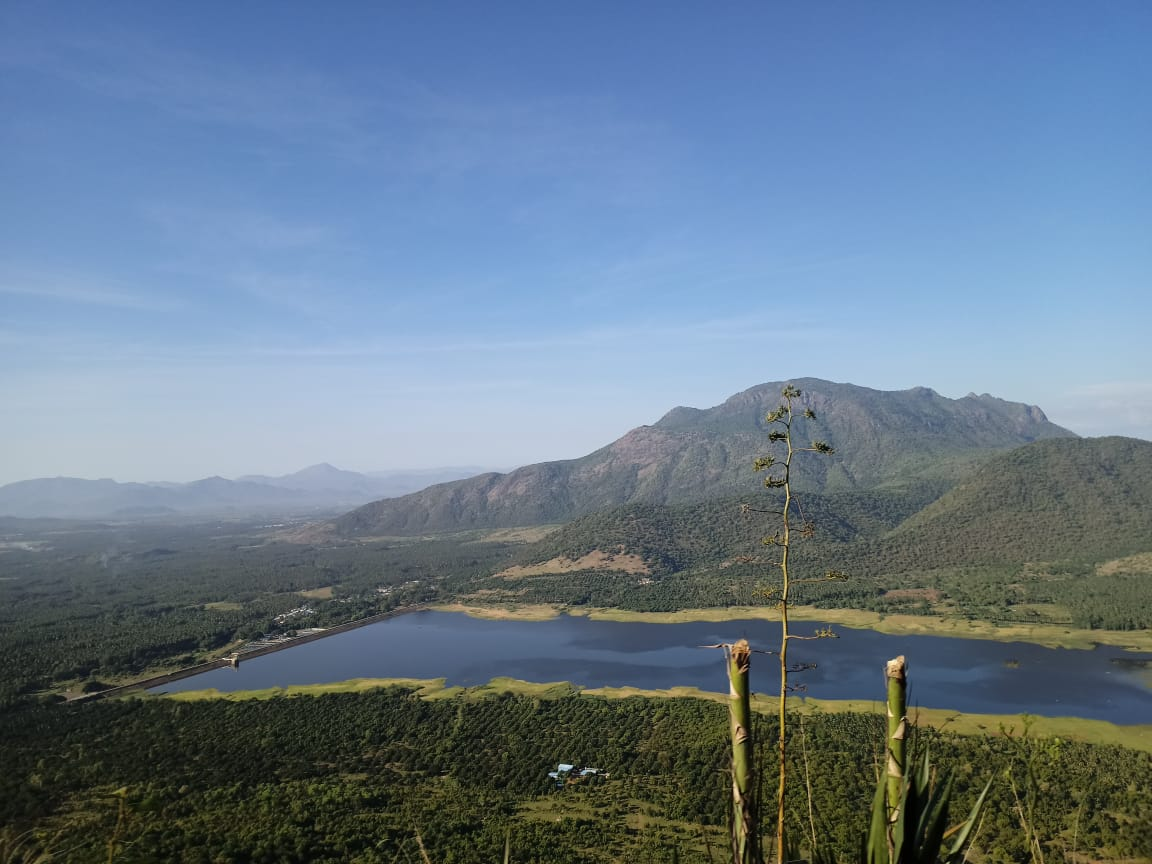
- Manjalar Dam and reservoir as seen from the north

- Location in Tamil Nadu
- Country: India
- Location: Devadanapatti, Theni district, Tamil Nadu
- Coordinates: 10°11′44″N 77°38′01″E
- Status: Operational
- Owner: Tamil Nadu
- Operator: Tamil Nadu

Dam and spillways
- Impounds: Manjalar River

The Manjalar Dam is a dam across the Manjalar River in the Indian state of Tamil Nadu.

Across the river at around 6 kilometres (4 mi) from Devadhanapatti bus stand. The dam is situated in Theni District, Manjalar Dam has been constructed for irrigation purposes. Manjalar Dam is at the end of Manjalar Road about 5.5 kilometres (3.4 mi) north from SH-36 at Devadanapatti town beginning along Kamatchi Amman temple road. Manjalar dam can be viewed from the Kodai Ghat road, en route to Kodaikanal, about 19 kilometres (12 mi) from Batlagundu.

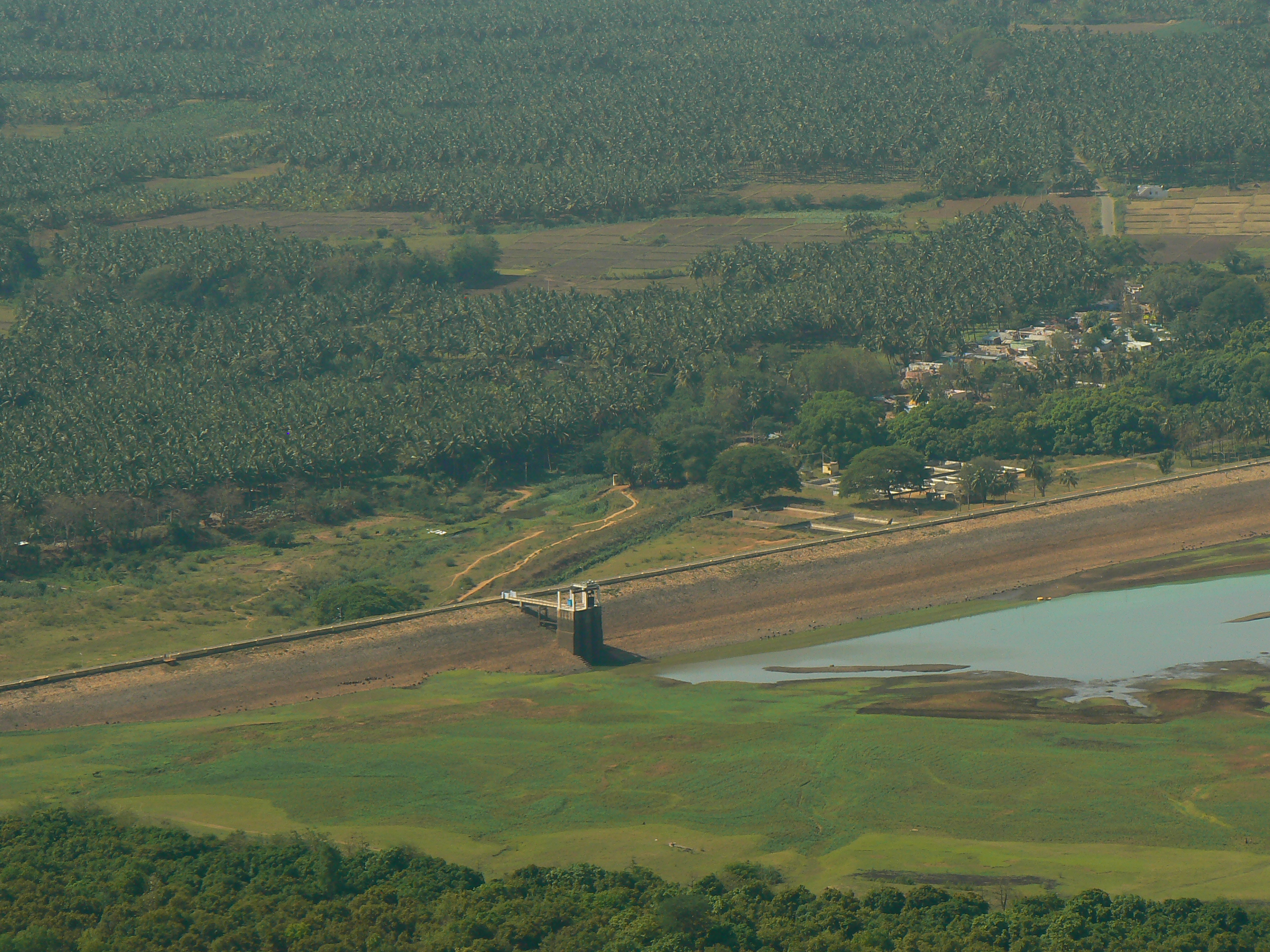
Close-up

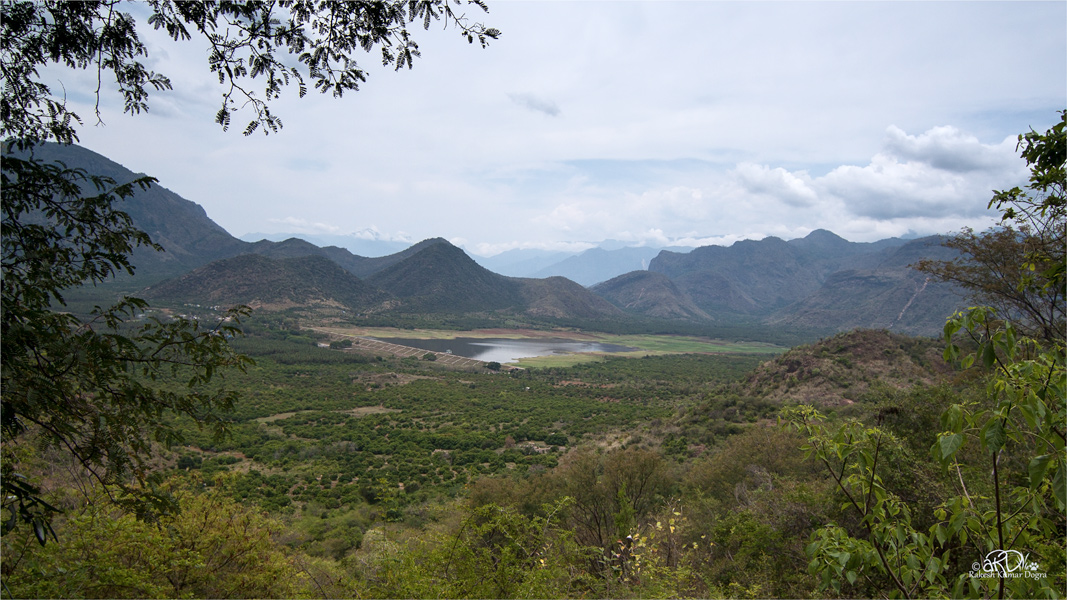
Dam and reservoir

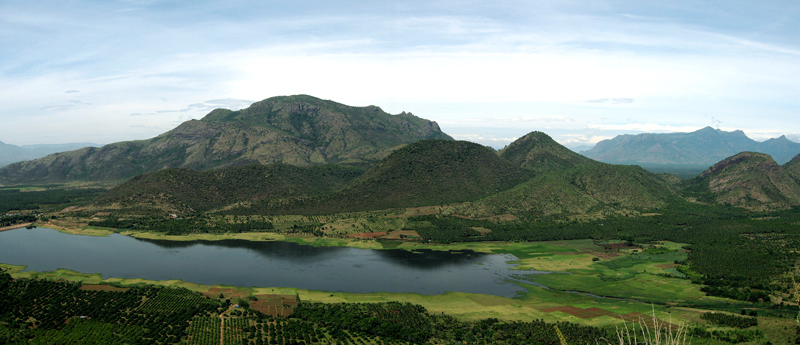
Reservoir from State Highway 156

== See also ==
- Sothuparai Dam
- Vaigai Dam
