= Asra Garg =

Indian Police Service officer

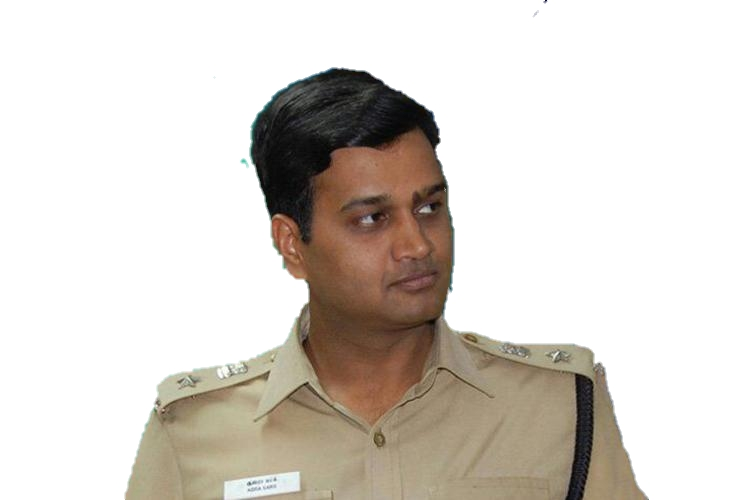
- Born: 23 October 1980 (age 46)
- Education: Thapar University
- Years active: 2004 – present
- Employer: Government of Tamil Nadu
- Organization: Tamil Nadu Police
- Known for: Fight against casteism and untouchability, controlling communally sensitive places and maintenance of law & order, conducting free and fair elections and investigation skills
Asra Garg
- Children: Yes
- Police career
- Department: Indian Police Service
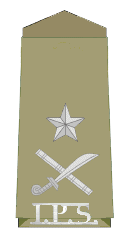
- Rank: Inspector General of Police, South Zone
- Awards: Tamil Nadu Chief Minister's Police Medal for Outstanding Devotion to Duty

Asra Garg is an Indian Police Service officer from the 2004 batch of Tamil Nadu Cadre. In 2023, Garg was posted as Additional Commissioner of Police, Law and Order (L&O), Chennai North in The Tamil Nadu Police.

== Personal life ==
Born in the city of Patiala, Garg completed his schooling from DAV in Mansa, Punjab, and later on went on to acquire a degree in electrical engineering from Thapar University. Although Garg's mother tongue is Punjabi, he is well-versed in Tamil. His parents are retired lecturers who taught at institutions in Patiala.

== Career ==
=== Early career ===
A 2004 batch officer from the Tamil Nadu Cadre, Garg began his police career at Tirupattur in the Vellore district as the Assistant Superintendent of Police.

=== Superintendent of Police ===
In 2008, Garg was appointed as the Superintendent of Police of Tirunelveli district (Rural), where he held office until 2010. During that period, Garg played a proactive role in managing the usury menace, and played a vital role in saving the people from the money lenders who were charging exorbitant interest rates; he formed a special force to track down and curtail the activities of moneylenders who used goons to collect loans.

Rather than waiting for complaints against any kind of crime, Garg made his team go out and find willing complainants.

Garg was also appreciated for curbing other criminal operations and maintaining the peace in the communally sensitive area.

In 2010, Garg was posted as the Superintendent of Police at the Madurai district, where he set out to fight against corruption and money distribution during the election. The conduct of elections by him was appreciated by Election Commission of India.

He also helped to resolve a major, long-standing communal conflict. He initiated peace negotiations between the warring Dalits and non-Dalits in the village of Uthapuram and ensured the entry of Dalits into the temple. Madras High Court has placed on record the "untiring efforts of the Superintendent of Police, IPS, in not only helping the court arrive at a proper solution to the dispute but also for brokering peace between the two warring groups".

Garg also filed several cases against teashop owners in Tirunelveli, Madurai, and Dharmapuri districts practicing the discriminatory two-tumbler system, wherein non-dalits are served tea in stainless steel tumblers, while dalits are served in disposable cups.

Garg is known for being humane and innovative in dealing with crimes. One such instance was the release of a woman who had murdered her husband. During the probe, police found out that the man was killed when he attempted to rape their daughter. Following this, Garg ordered her release under Section 100 of the IPC, holding that the woman, acted in self-defense. This brought national attention on the case as an instance of law not being blind after all.

In 2013, Garg was commended for preventing the marriage of an HIV-infected man with a young girl in Devadanapatti in Theni District of Tamil Nadu a few minutes before her marriage.

Garg also played a key role in the first conviction in the state in a case of land grabbing which was a very pertinent issue at the time. Besides, in Dharmapuri, Garg busted a kidney trade racket in 2013 by making several arrests and nabbing the kingpin, Garg brought an end to the organ grafting racket, which was one of the crimes with the highest gravity.

Garg took effective action against those involved in female infanticide and got murder cases registered against those involved in female infanticide.

=== Deputy Inspector General ===
In 2016, he went on to deputation to the Central Bureau of Investigation as Superintendent of Police. He was the head of the investigation team that detected the murder case of a school-going boy in Ryan International School, Gurgaon which was one of the most sensitive cases in recent times, attracting nationwide attention.

Eventually, Garg was promoted to Deputy Inspector General (DIG) of Police in February 2018, at the Central Bureau of Investigation, New Delhi.

Asra Garg again came into the limelight in September 2019 when he got the vice-president of a Hyderabad-based construction company arrested. Mr Ramachandra Rao Patri, Vice President of Soma Enterprise Limited, allegedly offered a bribe of ₹2 crores to Mr. Garg for settling a matter against the company. Garg immediately filed a complaint against the company executive and got him arrested.

=== Inspector General of Police ===
In 2022, Garg was promoted to the rank of Inspector General of Police and was later posted in the South Zone in Tamil Nadu. In 2023, Garg was posted as Additional Commissioner of Police, Law, and Order (L&O), Chennai North. In 2024, Garg was posted as Inspector General of Police, North Zone of Tamil Nadu. During his tenure as I.G., he was noted for his efforts in tackling ganja peddling across southern and northern parts of Tamil Nadu, including Chennai North.

The Madurai Bench of the Madras High Court appreciated his initiative to collect and present data using CNR numbers, thereby bypassing inefficient methods which lacked acknowledgement.

== Ranks Held ==
Indian Police Service
Insignia	Rank	Date Acquired
	Inspector-General – IG	2022
	Deputy Inspector-General – DIG	2018
	Superintendent of Police – SP	2008
	Assistant Superintendent of Police – ASP	2006

== Awards and honours ==
- Tamil Nadu Chief Minister's Police Medal for Outstanding Devotion to Duty in 2015.
- Tamil Nadu Chief Minister's Police Medal for Excellence in Public Service in 2023.
- Police Medal for Meritorious Service in 2023.
- Tamil Nadu Chief Minister's Special Medal for Remarkable Work Done in Fighting the Evil of Drug Menace and Illicit Trafficking of Drugs in 2023.

== See also ==
- Law enforcement in India
