= Kunnuvarankottai Kasi Visalakshi-Viswanathar Temple =

- Kasi Visalakshi-Viswanathar Temple, Kunnuvarankottai, Dindigul, Tamil Nadu

Religion
- Affiliation: Hinduism
- District: Dindigul
- Deity: Kasi Viswanathar
- Festival: Maha Shivaratri

Location
- Location: Kunnuvarankottai (Kannapatti)
- State: Tamil Nadu
- Country: India
- Interactive map of Kunnuvarankottai Kasi Visalakshi-Viswanathar Temple
- Coordinates: 10°06′24.3″N 77°46′45.5″E

Architecture
- Type: Dravidian architecture

Specifications
- Temple: One
- Elevation: 232.81 m (764 ft)

The Kasi Visalakshi Viswanathar temple is in the village of Kunnuvarankottai, which is a neighbourhood in Dindigul in the State of Tamil Nadu in India. This village is served by three rivers — Vaigai, Maruda and Manjalaru — called the Triveni Sangam (tri = three, veni = river, sangam = confluence). The river Vaigai takes a slightly northern course (Tamil: உத்தரவாஹினீ) near this village, like the Ganges takes at Varanasi.

== Kunnuvarankottai ==
Kunnuvarankottai is a village near Batlagundu which is on the foothills of Kodaikanal in Dindigul district. The Tamil name for this village is Kundru-Aran-Kottai which now is known as Kunnuvarankottai or Kannapatti.

== Kasi Visalakshi Viswanathar temple ==
Villagers believe that bathing in the confluence during holy days like Amavasya will enable the devotees to realise the purpose of life. There is a 500-year-old Visalakshi Viswanathar temple in the village by the riverside. The presiding deities are Goddess Visalakshi and God Viswanathar. It is similar in nature to the Kasi Visalakshi Viswanathar temple in many respects. The shrine for the Goddess Visalakshi faces south in this temple. As per the temple legend, the locals say that this idol was brought by a devotee from Kasi or Varanasi. There are other shrines for Lord Dakshinamoorthy, Bhairava, and Hanuman also.

The Kumbhabishekam of this temple was completed in 2001. In January 2013, the Punaruddharana Kumbhabishekam of this temple was completed. Shri K. V. Vishwanathan Sivachariyar is the priest. The temple conducts many festivals every year including Sivarathri (பிரதோஷம், சங்கடஹர சதுர்த்தி, சஷ்டி, நவராத்திரி).

=== Special feature ===
Sri Sacchidananda Bharati I (1623–1663) the 25th acharya of Sringeri Sharada Peetham was born in this area and the annual birthday is celebrated in this temple every year in Sravana month Rohini star. A Dhyana mandapam in the memory of this saint is in this village near the Vaigai River. It is pertinent to note that the current and the previous pontiff of Sringeri Sarada Peetam Sri Sri Sri Abhinava Vidyatirtha Swamigal visited this temple in 1965 and Sri Sri Bharathi Teertha Swamigal have graced this temple twice till date respectively. (Last visit was on 2 June 2012)

With the blessings and benevolence of Sri Sri Bharathi Teertha Swamigal, the Kumbhabhishekam of this temple was completed in January 2013 and a mandapam was constructed in front of Lord Sri Dakshinamoorthy shrine in this temple with the help of devotees.

Sri Sri Vidhusekhara Bharathi Swamigal visited this village during his visit to the town of Batlagundu in April 2017.
