= Sachchidananda Bharati I =

Sri Sacchidananda Bharati I Mahaswamiji
- Title: Jagadguru of Sringeri Sharada Peetham

Religious life
- Religion: Hinduism

Religious career
- Period in office: 1623–1663
- Predecessor: Abhinava Narasimha Bharati
- Successor: Narasimha Bharati VI

Sacchidananda Bharati I (Tamil: ஸ்ரீ ஸச்சிதாநந்த பாரதீ - 1, Devanāgarī: श्रीसच्चिदानन्द भारती - 1) was the Jagadguru Sankaracharya and pithathipati of the Sringeri Sharada Peetham from 1623 to 1663. he was the 20th jagadguru in the traditional sringeri guruparampara lineage.

== Early life ==
Sacchidananda was born Narasimha in 1607 AD. in the village of Srikanteswarapuram (Sanskrit: श्रीकण्ठ॓श्वरपुरम्) now known as Kunnuvarankottai (Kunnuvarankottai Kasi Visalakshi-Viswanathar temple#Kunnuvarankottai-Tamil: குன்னுவாரங்கோட்டை) or Kannapatti (Tamil: கண்ணாபட்டி) near Batlagundu in the southern part of India. This village has been referred by various names, namely, Ardhanareeswarapuram, Jandrapatti or Jandrapalle in those times as per the biography. This village was in Madurai District and is presently located in the Dindigul district (from 1985 onwards) of Tamil Nadu.

== Pontificate ==
Sachchidananda Bharati soon acquired mastery over the Vedas and shastras and visited many famous shrines including Madurai Meenakshi Temple. It can be observed from his biography that he lived in Madurai and Melmangalam village also for a short period during his Brahmacharya and learned the Vedas and Sastras there. Initially, he wanted to marry the daughter of his maternal uncle. But the then Jagadguru Sri Abhinava Narasimha Bharati, who was also from the same Batlagundu region advised him in favor of celibacy and persuaded him to become a sanyasin (Hindu monk).

Sachchidananda Bharati was ordained pontiff of the Sringeri Sharadha Peetam in 1623. When he ascended the pontificial chair, the southern part of India was beset with civil war and turmoil. During this period, Venkatappa Nayaka was the ruler of Ikkeri.(See Nayakas of Keladi). Sri Sri Sri Sachchidananda Bharathi-I is said to have visited Ikkeri upon the invitation of the ruler Venkatappa Nayaka. From there, accompanied by Venkatappa Nayaka, the 25th Jagadguru visited the Kollur Mookambika temple. It is learnt that in 1629, King Virabhadra Nayaka ascended the throne of Ikkeri after Venkatappa Nayaka. During this period, this region was invaded by many neighboring kingdoms.(See Nayakas of Keladi).

Sachchidananda Bharathi-I is considered by his devotees to have saved Sringeri through his penance and austerities during a period when Sringeri was attacked by a neighboring King Bhairava of Kalasapuram thrice. The King of Ikkeri, Virabhadra Nayaka (See Nayakas of Keladi) came in support of the Sringeri Mutt and the surrounding territory. He was defeated by King Bhairava twice and thus Bhairava was emboldened to attack Sringeri the third time. Sri Sachidananda Bharathi-I prayed for divine help through his penance and austerities. The next day, the Jagadguru was informed that he had left the town. The Guru had a dream later in which the surrounding deities informed him that they had defended and protected Sringeri.

The Kings of Ikkeri, Virabhadra Nayaka, and Sivappa Nayaka who were supportive of Sringeri have bestowed several grants of land to Sringeri Sarada Peetam during this period.

Sachchidananda Bharathi-I is considered by his devotees to have saved Sringeri and contributed to its fame. He was also regarded as a good administrator, and well regarded and respected by all people of all faiths and all sections of society.

Visit to the Dhyana mandapam in the memory of the 25th Pontiff of Sri Sachidananda Bharathi-I

Lord Visalakshi Vishwanatha Temple Tower

An Inscription of the 25th Pontiff Sri Sachidananda Bharathi-I

== Biographies ==
The most popular biography of Sachchidananda Bharati is by R.Krishnaswami Iyer who based his biography on Sanskrit manuscripts from the period. While studying the Ramachandra Mahodaya Kavya of Sri Sachchidananda Bharati swami, the 25th Jagadguru as per the advice of Sri Sri Sri Abhinava Vidya Theertha Swamigal, he discovered another manuscript dealing with the life of that Jagadguru and bearing the title - Sri Ramachandra Mahodaya Kavya Kartru Swarupa Prakasam.

== Compositions, Hymns and Works ==
Sri Sacchidananda Bharati (I) is said to have composed Gurustutisatakam (Sanskrit: गुरुस्तुति शतकम्) which details the lives of all the Acharyas of Sringeri from Adi Sankara till the 24th Pontiff Sri Abhinava Narasimha Bharati. He has also composed other hymns and metrical works such as Meenakshi Satakam (Sanskrit: मीनाक्षी शतकम्), Meenakshi Ashtakam (Sanskrit: मीनाक्षी अष्टकम्) in the remembrance of His stay in Madurai and visit to the Goddess Meenakshi temple, Rama Bhujanga (Sanskrit: रामभुजङ्गम्), Kovidashtakam and Ramachandra Mahodayakavyam. Rama Bhujangam has been composed in Bhujanga Prayaata meter belonging to the Bhujanga group. (See Sanskrit prosody). Many authors have referred in their articles to a notable verse in the Rama Bhujanga which means that this Bhujangam (snake) is said to drive away the lust and anger (rats) when it is enshrined in one's heart. He also refers here to the Lord Rama in Sri Rama temple in his native Village Jandrapatti.

Sri Sacchidananda Bharati (I) built and consecrated the Goddess Bhavani shrine within the temple of Sri Malahanikareshwara on the top of a hillock in Sringeri. Several festivals including the rathotsava were started by the 25th Jagadguru which are being celebrated even to this day.

During the visit of Sri Sri Bharati Tirtha Mahaswamigal of Sringeri Sarada Peetam in May 2012 to Madurai, He released a book on “Sri Meenakshi Shatakam (Sanskrit: मीनाक्षी शतकम्) consisting of about 122 verses on Goddess Meenakshi of Madurai. (See para above) composed by this 25th Pontiff.

During the visit of Sri Sri Bharati Tirtha Mahaswamigal and Sri Sri Vidhu Sekhara Bharathi swamigal of Sringeri Sarada Peetam in April 2017 to Madurai, Sri Sri Bharati Tirtha Mahaswamigal recalled that the 25th Jagadguru hailed from this Madurai region (erstwhile Pandya Kingdom) and mentioned about the “Sri Meenakshi Shatakam (Sanskrit: मीनाक्षी शतकम्). (See para above) composed by the 25th Jagadguru.

== Places associated with Sachchidananda Bharati I ==
The village of Kunnuvarankottai is an important place of pilgrimage associated with Swami Sachchidananda Bharati. This village is served by three rivers Vaigai (Vaigai River), Maruda and Manjalaru called as Triveni Sangam Sanskrit: त्रिवेणी सङमम् - Tamil: த்ரிவேணீ - சங்கமம்- Meaning - Tri - Three, Veni - river, Sangam - Confluence (as mentioned in the biography). The river Vaigai takes a slightly northern course (Tamil: உத்தரவாஹினீ, Sanskrit: उत्तरवाहिनी also known as Ganga (Ganges) in Varanasi) near this village. It is inferred from the article in "Amman Darisanam" and the author's foreword in Part-II of the biography that the 35th Pontiff Sri Sri Sri Abhinava Vidyateertha Mahaswamigal and the current pontiff Sri Sri Bharathi Teertha Mahaswamigal have visited this village. The author R Krishnaswamy Iyer has made an anecdotal reference in the foreword of Part-II, regarding the visit, the holy dip of the 35th pontiff in the point of confluence of these rivers, His visit to old Koti Mukteeswarar temple here, performance of His daily Sri Sarada Chandramouleeswara Puja in this nearby village and His benedictory talk on the significance of this area (Sthalam (Tamil: ஸ்தலம்)" (Sanskrit: स्थलम्) in 1965.

The Jayanthi (birthday) of 25th Pontiff Sri Sri Sri Sachchidananda Bharathi Maha Swamigal is mentioned in the biography as in the month of Sravana-Rohini star. The Jayanthi is celebrated in this Kunnuvarankottai Kasi Visalakshi-Viswanathar temple as per the advice and benedictions of 35th pontiff (refer His talk above) every year by devotees from 1965. The article in Amman Darisanam also mentions about the Kumbhabhisekham of this temple in 2001. Shri V.Viswanatha Sivachariyaar is the priest of this temple. There are other shrines for Lord Dakshinamoorthy, Bhairava, and Hanuman also.

With the blessings and benevolence of Sri Sri Bharathi Teertha Swamigal and with the help of devotees, the Kumbhabhishekam of this temple was completed in January 2013 and a mandapam was constructed in front of Lord Sri Dakshinamoorthy shrine in this temple.

Sri Sri Vidhusekhara Bharathi Swamigal visited this village during his visit to the town of Batlagundu in April 2017.

This is a photograph of the remains of the old temple which is found in the biography. The outer wall of this temple contains an ancient Tamil inscription. (See history below). This temple was near the point of confluence of the three rivers before it is believed by the locals to have been damaged by natural calamities (like floods). The current village settlement and temple of Lord Visalakshi Viswanathar half-a-kilometre away is believed to have been reconstructed after the damage done by natural calamities (like floods).

== History of this region ==
A study was conducted by the archaeologists of the Mu. Rasamanikkanar historical research centre, Trichy recently on the ancient Tamil inscription found in a dilapidated temple in this area as per the article published in the Kalki Tamil Magazine. This article mentions that this temple belongs to the 13th century AD and the inscription is deciphered thus – This village was called Kelundagam during this period and was a trading outpost to the traders and merchants carrying goods eastwards towards Madurai (Capital of Pandyan Kingdom - Pandyan dynasty). The inscription further states that a group of eighteen merchants guild was responsible for collection of taxes from the traders transporting goods. The tax money thus collected had to be spent for the upkeep of the Lord Siva temple (Madurai Udaya Eswaran - மதுரை உதய ஈஸ்வரன்) and the Lord Vishnu temple (Thiru Kannudaya Vinnagaram - திரு கண்ணுடைய விண்ணகரம்) found in this area near the confluence of the rivers Vaigai and Manjalaru. The article has published the photographs of the old temple walls. The article mentions about a very rare sculpture in the outer temple wall that depicts the capital punishment meted out to the criminals during that age. The study mentions that these types of paintings are also found in Madurai Meenakshi temple. Thus, this is connected to the Pandyan Kingdom due to the name of the Lord Siva temple (Madurai Udaya Eswaran) and also the sculpture resembling Pandya architecture. The study mentions that it could not read the entire inscription as the walls are submerged underground. As this area was near the confluence of the rivers Vaigai (also called Vegavathy in this region) and Manjalaru, locals refer to this area as "Mukkuttuthurai" which means a port. From the study, this port served the local merchants to transport goods to the capital city of the Pandyan Kingdom which is Madurai. The river is called Vegavathy (fast flowing river) as it gushes downwards from the Varushanad Valley. This helps in navigation and transportation of goods through boats in the Pandyan Kingdom.

The Pandyan dynasty is described in detail in the articles of Wikipedia through the ages – Pandyan dynasty. As per the historical records, this area may have been ruled by various Pandyan Kings from Maravarman Sundara Pandyan, Sundaravarman Kulasekaran II through Jatavarman Sundara Pandyan who ruled Madurai until late 13th century AD.

The early part of the 14th century saw the gradual decline of the Pandya dynasty resulting in the repeated invasions of the South Indian Kingdoms by the Delhi Sultanate. Ala-ud-din Khilji of the slave dynasty from Delhi dispatched his general, Malik Kafur, in 1310. Malik Kafur marched south, ransacking kingdoms in central and Southern India on the way to Madurai. He marched into Madurai, sacking the town, paralysing trade, suppressing public worship, and making civilian life miserable. The great Meenakshi temple with its fourteen towers was pulled down, destroying the nearby streets and buildings, and leaving only the two shrines of Sundaresvara and Meenakshi intact. Sultan dynasty (Madurai Sultanate) was soon established at Madurai, ruling Madurai for around 50 years during the 14th century. This period was a dark period for Madurai Meenakshi temple (Meenakshi Amman Temple) in Tamil Nadu as there was no puja during this period and the idol of Goddess Meenakshi was taken out of the city. During this period, most of South India came under the Delhi sultanate rule.

The Vijayanagar empire (Vijayanagara Empire) under Bukka Raya I made a series of efforts to conquer Southern India and re-establish a Hindu Kingdom. The king was blessed by the 12th Sringeri Peetadhipathi Saint Vidyaranya (1380–1386) of Sringeri Sarada Peetam in these efforts. There were a series of Vijayanagar invasions in the middle of the fourteenth century which succeeded in initially restricting and finally ending the Madurai Sultanate's rule over Madurai.Vijayanagar's armies were led by Bukka's son Kumara Kampanna Udaiyar and Veera Savanan. They defeated and killed Muslim ruler Hassan Gangu in 1371. Thus, the Sultan rule of the region was overthrown by the new Hindu kingdom of Vijayanagar, which had been founded at Hampi. For the next two centuries, this empire withstood repeated Sultan invasions from the north. Kampana Udaiyar started a dynasty, subordinate to the court of Vijayanagar that lasted for two centuries. The immediate effect of this victory was the reopening of the Siva and Vishnu temples in the cities of Madurai, Srirangam, Chidambaram and Kanchipuram in the southern region. The rule was continued by Vijayanagar-appointed governors who had "Nayaka" as a title. King Krishna Devaraya (1509–1529), the greatest ruler of the Vijayanagar dynasty, exercised close control over this part of his empire.

Nagama Nayaka was the officer of Vijayanagara king Krishnadeva raya ruling Madurai and was followed by Viswanatha Nayaka. (see Madurai Nayak dynasty for more information.)

The Nayaka dynasty was formally started by Viswanatha Nayaka in Madurai. The Madurai Nayaks (Madurai Nayak dynasty) were rulers from around 1529 until 1736, of a region comprising most of modern-day Tamil Nadu, India, with Madurai as their capital.The Nayak reign was an era noted for its achievement in arts, cultural and administrative reforms, revitalization of temples previously ransacked by the Delhi Sultans, and inauguration of a unique architectural style. The Pandyan kingdom was divided into 72 palayams by the King Viswanatha Nayaka (1529–1563) and his minister Ariyanatha Mudaliar. Viswanatha Nayaka and Ariyanatha Mudaliar rebuilt and renovated the Madurai Meenkashi temple along with the thousand pillared hall.

The period of Sri Sachchidananda Bharati I was during the 17th century under the reign of Nayak dynasty of Madurai as per Madurai Nayak dynasty under the two Nayak kings Muttu Virappa Nayaka (1609–1623) and Tirumalai Nayaka (1623–1659). The foreword written by Shri K.R Venkatraman, editor of Sankara Krupa in the biography of Sri Sachchidananda Bharati I mentions about this history of Madurai also and the renovation of Madurai Meenakshi temple by the Kings Muttu Virappa Nayaka and Thirumala Nayak under the minister-ship of Shri Neelakanda Deekshithar. The period of the King Muthu Veerappa Naikar (1609–1623) was during the childhood of Sri Sachidananda Bharathi-I. Sri Sachidananda Bharathi-I stayed in Madurai as a Brahmachari for some time. During this period, the kambathadi mandapam and vasantharaya mandapam were completed by this king. During the period of Thirumalai Nayaka (1623–1659), Sri Sachidananda Bharathi-I was ordained as the peetadhipathi of Sringeri Sarada Peetam. His minister Neelakanta Deekshithar built the pudu mandapam and reestablished the pujas for the deities in the Madurai Meenakshi temple as per the puranas like "Haalaasya Mahatmiyam" and agama rules. This can be seen even now in Madurai Meenakshi temple. The area near Kunnuvarankottai, the birthplace of 25th Jagadguru came under the Batlagundu Palayam of the 72 palayams above whose chief was Madhiraja. This biography also mentions about the Lord Siva Temple (Koti Muktheeshwarar temple) and Lord Vishnu temple (Lord Rama temple, Varadaraja Perumal temple) in this region during this period. Local Legends and oral folklore (poems of Siva temple singers called Oduvars) from this region who sing songs in the temple in various ragas (பண்) of carnatic music refer to the Lord Siva of this temple as SriKantaPuravasane. (Tamil- ஶ்ரீகண்டபுரவாசனே) Sanskrit: श्रीकण्ठ॓श्वरपुरम् - Srikanteswarapuram in Sanskrit). This oral tradition has continued till this day in the Lord Siva temples. There is another Mukteeswarar temple near Vandiyur Mariamman Teppakulam ( Vandiyur Mariamman Teppakulam) in Madurai built by King Thirumalai Nayaka (1623–1659). This is related to the subjects of ancient temple history and archaeology of South India, ancient temple sculptures, architecture, paintings, navigation, transportation and ports of ancient Pandya and Nayak dynasties.

== Visit on 2 June 2012 ==
Sri Sri Bharathi Teertha Mahaswamigal visited this village during his visit to the town of Batlagundu in June 2012. He visited the Dhyana mandapam of the 25th pontiff and the Kunnuvarankottai Kasi Visalakshi-Viswanathar temple. The devotees of this village organized a function in the premises of this temple to welcome the Jagadguru. In the Anugraha Bhashanam, the Jagadguru said that the 25th pontiff, Sri Sri Sri Sacchidananda Bharati I had reigned as the Peethadhipati for about 40 years and had enhanced the greatness of the Peetham. Jagadguru appreciated the efforts of the villagers for having built a Dhyana Mandapam in this village for Sri Sri Sri Sacchidananda Bharati I. He recalled his visits to this village in 1987 and his Guru's visit in 1965 and blessed the residents of this village along with the proposed construction of a mandapam in the Vishalakshi Vishwanathar temple.

Later, the Jagadguru visited the ruins of the ancient temple which still exists near the point of confluence of the rivers. According to the villagers, this temple and the nearby tree was part of an ancient village that housed the poorvashrama home of the 25th pontiff. They also mentioned that the ancient village had been washed away by natural calamities like floods.

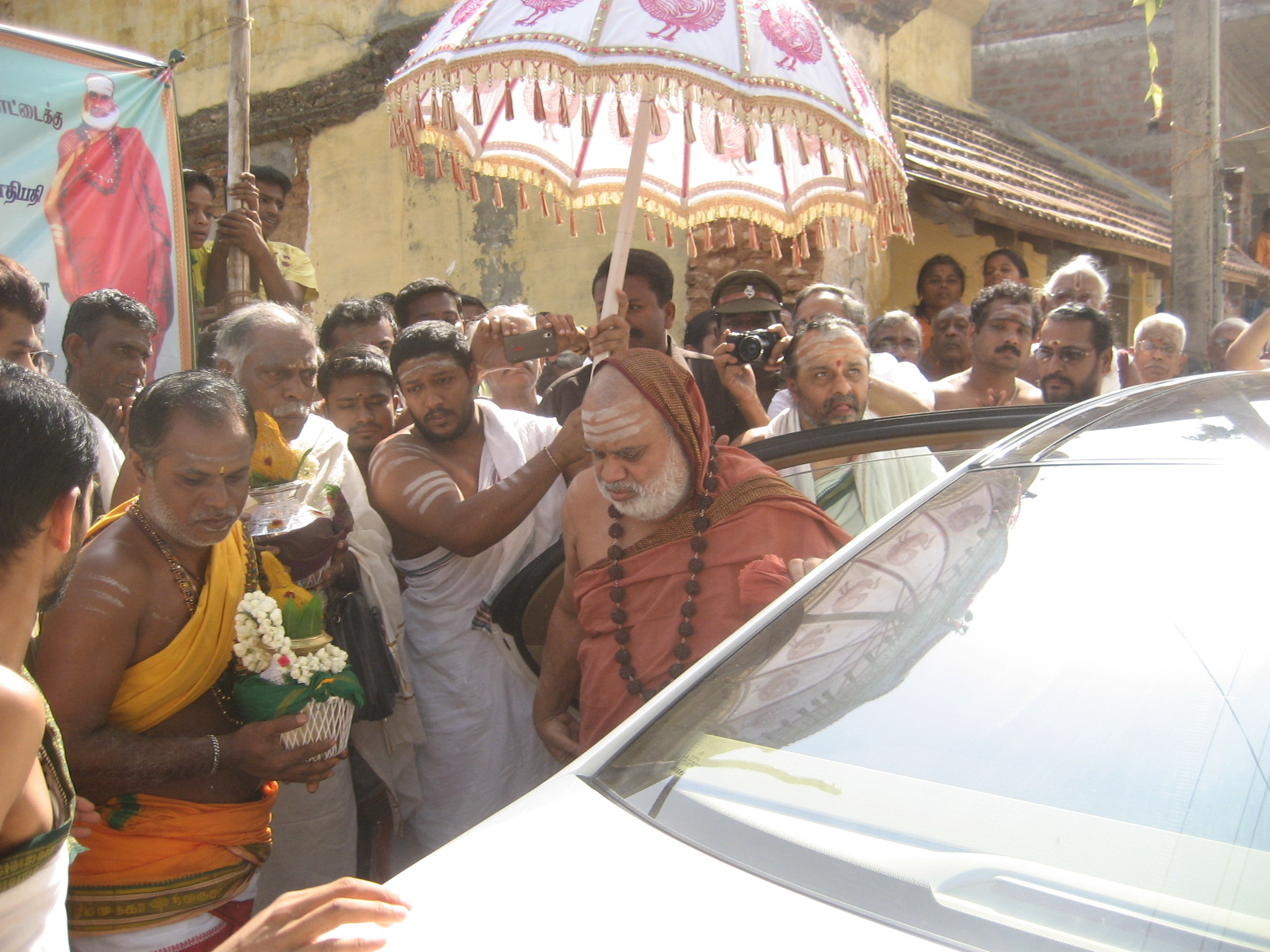
Arrival of Bharathi Teertha Swamigal, pontiff of Sringeri Sarada Peetam in the village of Kunnuvarankottai on 2 June 2012

Photograph of the entry into Kunnuvarankottai Kasi Visalakshi Viswanatha temple of Bharathi Teertha Swamigal, pontiff of Sringeri Sarada Peetam on 2 June 2012

Remains of old Koti Mukteeshwar temple near the point of confluence with the Kodaikanal Hills range in the background. Siddhar Malai, a hillock, is also visible.

The Kumbhabhishekam of this temple was completed in January 2013 and a mandapam was constructed in front of Lord Sri Dakshinamoorthy shrine in this temple.

== Visit on 21 April 2017 ==
Sri Sri Vidhusekhara Bharathi swamigal visited this village during his visit to the town of Batlagundu in April 2017. He visited the Dhyana mandapam of the 25th pontiff and the Kunnuvarankottai Kasi Visalakshi-Viswanathar temple. The devotees of this village organized a function in the premises of this temple to welcome the Sri Sri Vidhusekhara Bharathi Swamigal. In the Anugraha Bhashanam, the Jagadguru appreciated the efforts of the villagers for having built a Dhyana Mandapam in this village for Sri Sri Sri Sacchidananda Bharati I.He mentioned that birthplaces of Jagadgurus happen at holy spots as per general belief of the Hindus and cited the incident of Lord Anjaneya idol unearthed in the holy birthplace of Sri Sri Bharathi Teertha Mahaswamigal in Machilipatnam. Therefore, he mentioned that it is natural to consecrate such holy spots as they are birth places of holy saints as is generally believed by the Hindus.

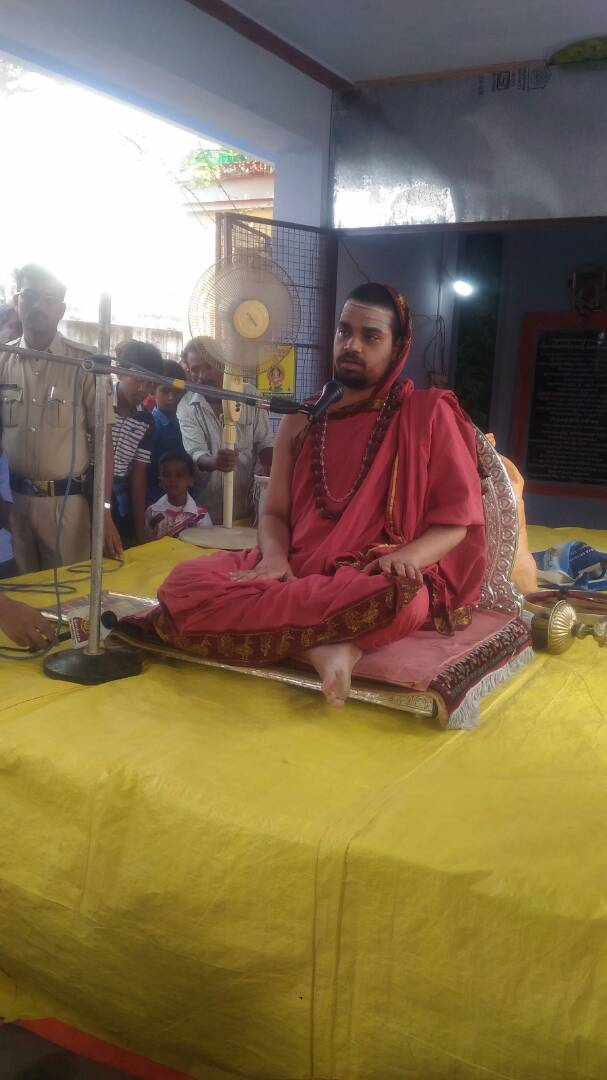
Sri Sri Vidhusekhara Bharathi Swamigal of Sringeri in Kunnuvarankottai in April 2017 Speech

== See also ==
- Jagadguru of Sringeri Sharada Peetham

== External sources ==
- Biography of Jagadguru Sri Sachchidananda's life (1623–1663) (ENGLISH Edition) by R. Krishnaswami Iyer (Swami Jnanananda Bharati).
- http://www.sringeri.net/jagadgurus/the-later-acharyas-2
- R. Venkataramani. (August 2003. P. 8,9,10,11,12,13). "Sringeri Sarada Peedathin 25th Peetadhipadhi - Mudalam Sachchidananda Bharathi", 'Amman Darisanam', Tamil Periodical. சிருங்கேரி சாரதா பீடத்தின் 25வது பீடாதிபதி - முதலாம் ஸச்சிதானந்த பாரதீ, அம்மன் தரிசனம், தமிழ் பத்திரிகை
- Swami Saccidananda Bharati (I), Jagadguru Sankaracharya of Sringeri, Gurustutisatakam, Sri Vani Vilas Press, Srirangam, 1971, Library Of Congress, Washington D.C., U.S.A, LC Call No.: MLCS 93/1716 (B) - Refer Library of Congress catalog in http://catalog.loc.gov/
- Sri Sankara krupa, Tamil Periodical, Tiruchirapalli, 1962.
- S.R. Swami. (November 2008. P. 432). "Sri Sachchidananda Bharathi-I - Acharyalin Varaltru Thoguppu", 'Amman Darisanam', Deepavali Special edition, Tamil Periodical
- 'Tattvaloka', English Monthly Magazine. (October 2009. P. 50). "News and Events - Books Released" - New book on 'Gurustutishatakam', a eulogy of Sringeri Guruparampara composed by the 25th Jagadguru of Sringeri Sharada Peetham, Sachchidananda Bharathi Mahaswamiji with a commentary pertaining to Vedanta, Vyakarana and Tantra by Sri Lakshmana Sharma.
- Online Link - http://www.tattvaloka.com/Documents/4.NewsEventsOct09.htm
- Sri Sri Sri Sacchidananda Bharati Mahasvaminah with commentary by Sri Lakshmana Sarma, Samskrit Book. (October 2009.). "Sri Gurustutisatakam", Sri Shankara Advaita Research Center, Dakshinamnaya Sri Sharda Peetham, Sringeri, Karnataka, Sri Offset - Vidya Bharati Press, Shankarapuram, Bangalore.
- श्रीभारतीतीर्थवॆदशास्त्रग्रन्थमाला - दशमं कुसुमम् -॥ गुरुस्तुतिशतकम्॥ - शृङ्गगिरिजगद्गुरु श्रीसच्चिदानन्दभारतीमहास्वामिविरचितम् - व्य़ाख्याता लक्ष्मणशर्मा -सम्पादाक: - विद्वान् एम् . ए . नागराजभट्ट: गिरि: - श्रीश्रीजगद्गुरुशङ्कराचार्य महासंस्थानम् दक्षिणाम्नाय श्रीशारदापीठम्, शृङ्गगिरि: - (October 2009).
- http://www.sringeri.net/branches/tamil-nadu/vattalagundu - Link to Sringeri mutt branch in Vattalagundu and reference to Dhyana mandapam in Kunnuvarankottai.
- http://www.gnananandabharathi.org/ - Link to the website of Swami Gnananda Bharathi (Sri R. Krishnaswamy Iyer), his biography, his publications in Tamil and English and photo gallery.
- K. Narayanaswamy, Vidyaranyapuram (Sringeri). (October 2009. P. 074,075,076,077,078,079). "Sringeriyil Olirntha Madurai Maharatnam",சிருங்கேரியில் ஒளிர்ந்த மதுரை மஹாரத்தினம், Amman Darisanam, Deepavali Special Edition, Tamil Periodical.
- K Venkateswaran, Madurai (1–15 March 2010. P. 38, 39, 40, 41). "Kunnuvarankottai Ulaga Naayagan" Tamil: குன்றுவாரங்கோட்டை உலக நாயகன், Kumudham Bhakthi Special Tamil: குமுதம் பக்தி ஸ்பெஷல், Tamil Periodical.
- Re. Ramamurthy. (February 2010. P. 11). "Sri Ramakrishna Paramahamsar Aruliya Inkadhai Kavidai", Saravana Padippagam,Tamil: பண்டித திரு. ரெ. ராமமூர்த்தி, வித்துவான் ரா. அரங்க கிருஷ்ணன், ஸ்ரீ ராமக்ருஷ்ண பரமஹம்சர் அருளிய இன்கதை கவிதை, சரவணா பதிப்பகம் Chinmaya Nagar, Chennai-600 092, Collection of Tamil poems and short stories.
- (29 August 2010, P.7). "Kunnuvarankottayil Sacchidananda Bharathi Jayanthi",குன்னுவாரங்கோட்டையில் சச்சிதாநந்த பாரதீ ஜயந்தி, Dinamalar Tamil Daily newspaper, Madurai and Dindigul Editions.
- https://www.usnews.com/articles/news/sacred-places/2007/11/16/a-place-for-the-dead-and-the-living.html - Link for Varanasi
- http://nwda.gov.in/writereaddata/sublink2images/239.pdf - Reference to Vaigai river and its tributaries
- https://web.archive.org/web/20130506071522/http://vijayayatra.sringeri.net/vathalagundu-june-1-2012/ - Visit of the current pontiff on 1–2 June 2012 to Kunnuvarankottai and Vathalagundu - This contains the photographs taken in the village along with the inscriptions
- http://vijayayatra.sringeri.net - Website of Sringeri Sarada Peetam for the visit of the current pontiff to Tamil Nadu, Kerala and Karnataka in 2012.
- https://web.archive.org/web/20130228023700/http://vijayayatra.sringeri.net/madurai-may-21-2012/ - Visit to Madurai of the current pontiff of Sringeri Sarada Peetam in 2012 and release of the book on "Meenakshi Shatakam" in Madurai.
- http://www.sringeri.net/temples/sri-malahanikareshwara/sri-bhavani - Goddess Bhavani Shrine in the Sri Malahanikareshwara Temple in Sringeri
- (13-10-2013). "Sri Viswanathar Temple", Dinamalar Tamil daily newspaper, - https://temple.dinamalar.com/en/new_en.php?id=1145 -Website covering the features of this temple on the Vijayadasami day.
- (15 January 2016). "Kunnuvarankottaiyil 13th Century Tollgate", Dinamalar Tamil daily newspaper,- https://www.dinamalar.com/malarkal/pongal-malar-tamil-nadu-pongal-festival/13th-century-tolcade-at-gunnuvarayan-fort/28648
- http://vijayayatra.sringeri.net/vijayayatra/madurai-mar-27-apr-4-2017/ -Visit of the 36th and 37th Jagadgurus between 7 March – 4 April 2017 to Madurai.

Preceded by Abhinava Narasimha Bharati	Jagadguru of Sringeri Sharada Peetham; 1623–1663	Succeeded by Narasimha Bharati VI
