= Varaha River =

River in Teni, Tamil Nadu

Coordinates: 17°25′N 82°52′E

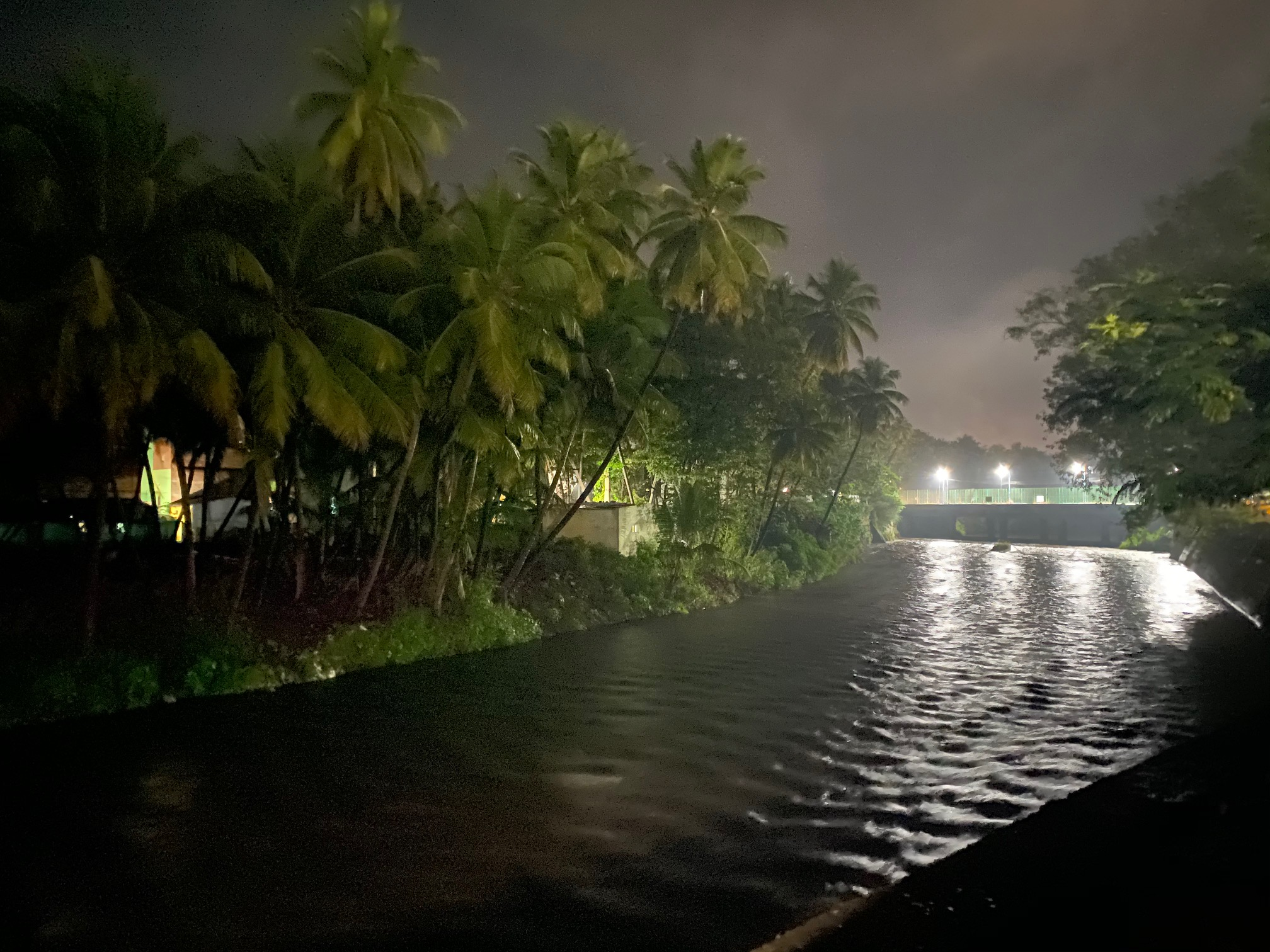
Varaha River in Periyakulam

The Varaha River (or Varahanadhi) is a small river that flows through the town of Periyakulam in Theni district of the state of Tamil Nadu in India. It joins the Vaigai River near Marugalpatti. The Sothuparai Dam spans the river near Periyakulam.

== See also ==
- Manjalar River
