= Silver Cascade Falls (India) =

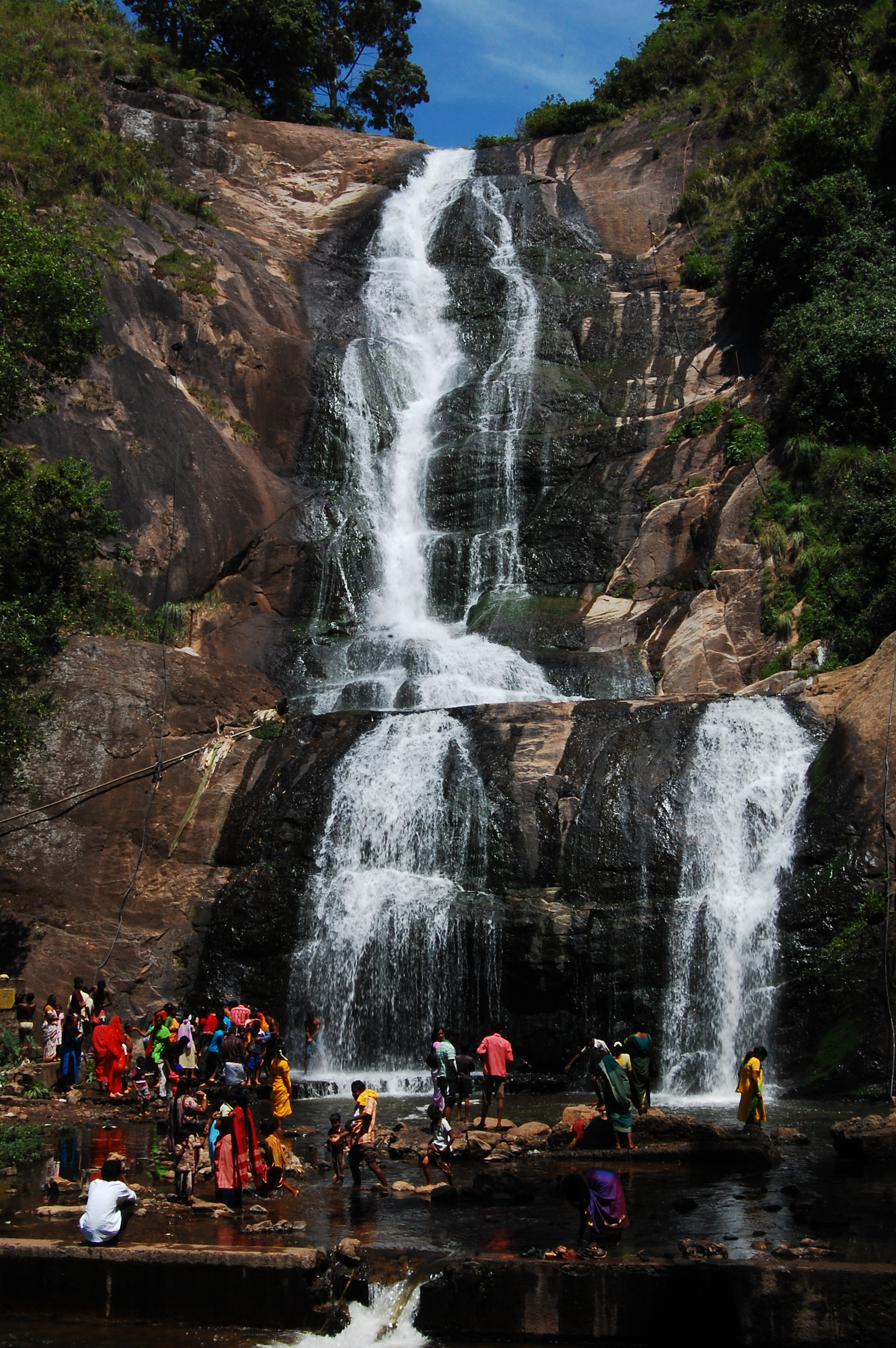
- Interactive map of Silver Cascade Falls
- Location: Dindigul district, Tamil Nadu, India
- Coordinates: 10°14′31″N 77°30′38″E
- Total height: Over 180 feet (55 m)

Silver Cascade Falls also known as Velli Aruvi is a waterfall located in Kodaikanal, Dindigul district, Tamil Nadu, India.

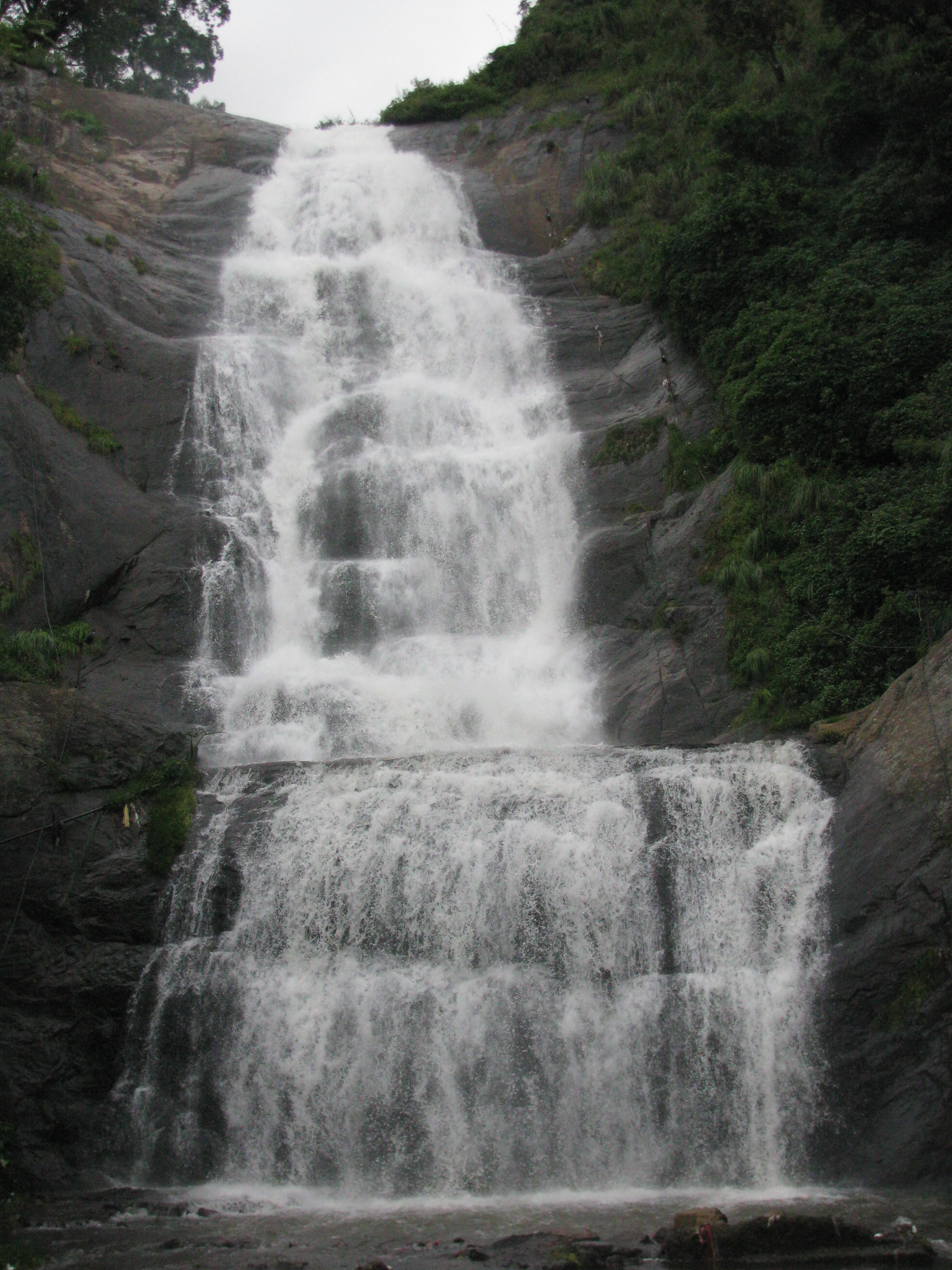
Rainy season

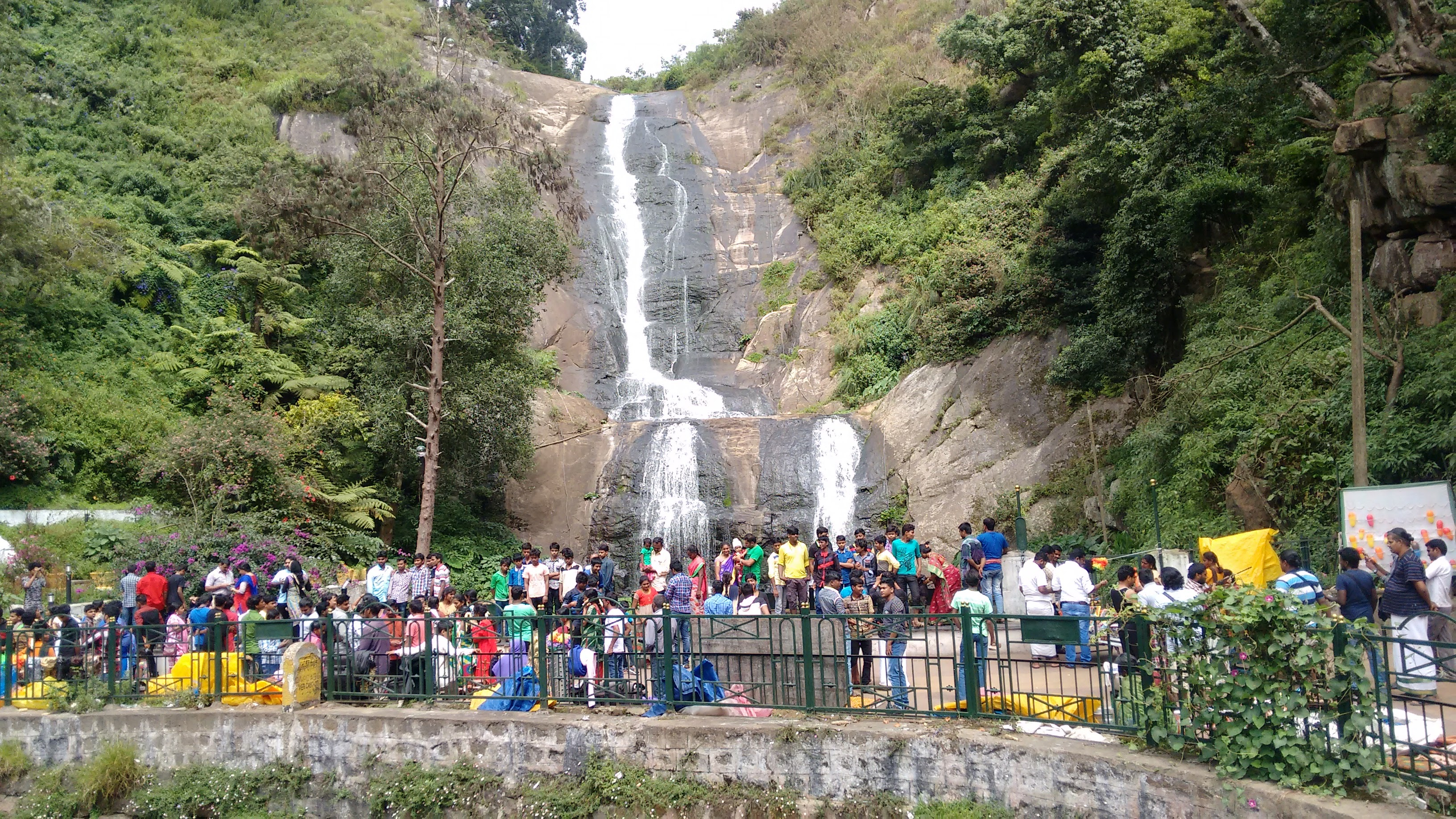
With visitors

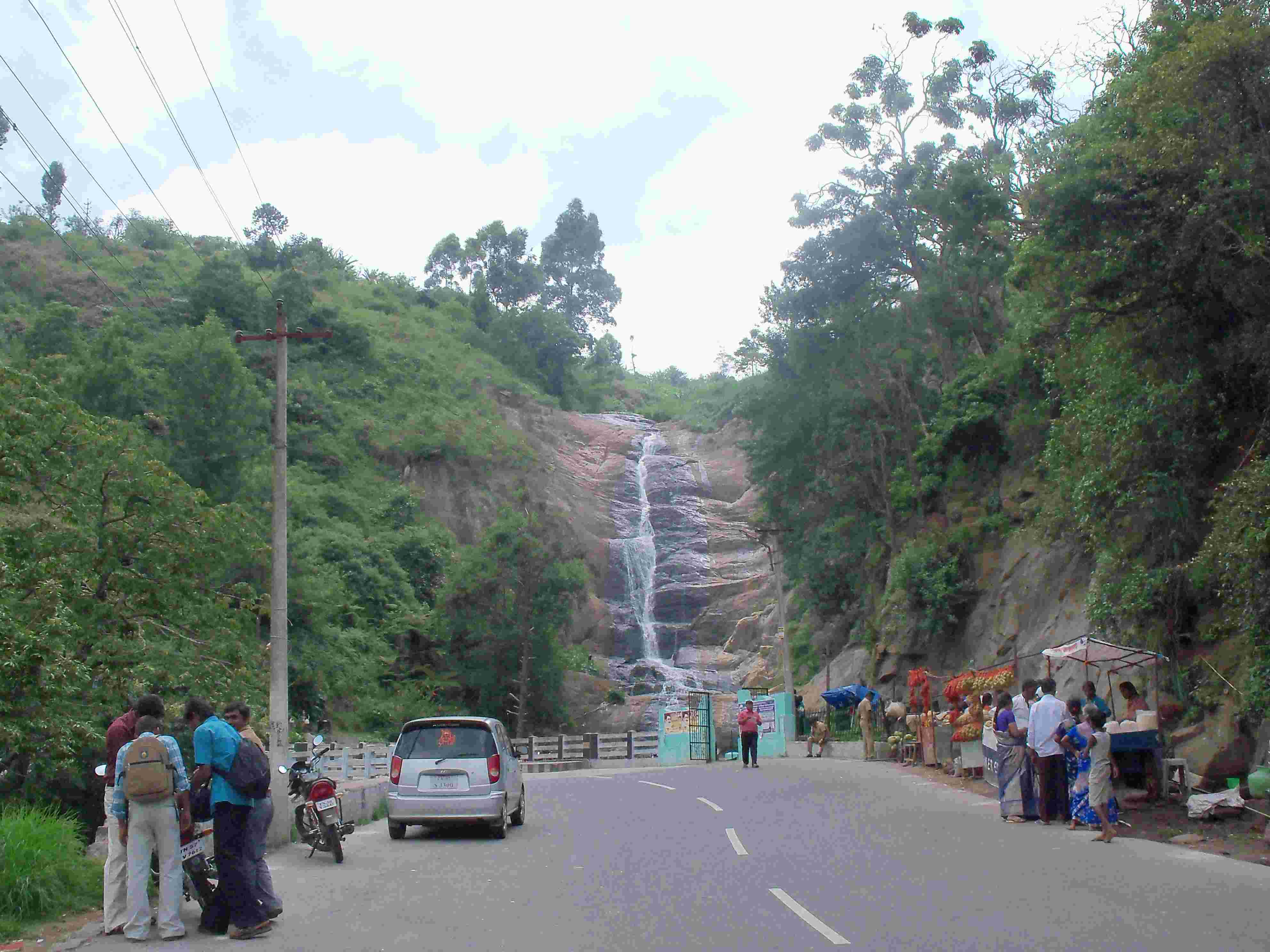
With Kodaikanal Ghat Road (State Highway 156)
