= Subramaniya Siva =

Indian writer and activist (1884–1925)

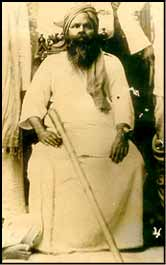
- Portrait of Subramaniya Siva
- Born: 4 October 1884; Batlagundu, Madurai District, Madras Presidency, British India
- Died: 23 July 1925 (aged 40); Papparapatti, Madras Presidency, British India

Subramaniya Siva (4 October 1884 – 23 July 1925) was an Indian independence activist, and writer. He was a supporter of Tanittamil Iyakkam, a linguistic purism movement, that advocated to get rid of loan words from the Tamil language.

== Life ==
Subramaniya Siva was born on 4 October 1884 into a Tamil Brahmin family in Batlagundu, Madurai District, Madras Presidency. He joined the Indian independence movement in the early 1900s. He considered himself as a sanyasi, and equated India's freedom from the British colonial rule with spiritual liberation. He worked along with other Tamil independence activists such as Subramania Bharati and V. O. Chidambaram. In 1908, he was arrested by the British and sent to jail. While serving his prison term, he was afflicted by leprosy.

Despite Siva's release from prison, the British authorities forbade him to travelling by rail because leprosy was regarded as a contagious disease. He was forced to travel on foot, and continued his political and literary activities. Between 1908 and 1922, he was imprisoned four times and endured severe physical hardship and poverty. He eventually succumbed to the disease and died on 23 July 1925.

== Literary works ==
Siva served as the editor of the journal Gnanabhanu. He authored more than 30 books in Tamil, across various themes. His major works include Ramaniya Vijayam, Sachithanandha Sivam, Sankara VIjayam, and Yoga Sadhana Rahasyam. He also wrote several plays, short stories, and a novel. He translated the works of Swami Vivekananda from English to Tamil. Siva was a supporter of Tanittamil Iyakkam, a linguistic purism movement, that advocated to get rid of loan words from the Tamil language. He promoted the movement through his works, and writings in the magazine Gnanabanu.

== Honours ==
A memorial for Siva has been established at Papparapatti in Dharmapuri district.
