= Devadanapatti =

- Town
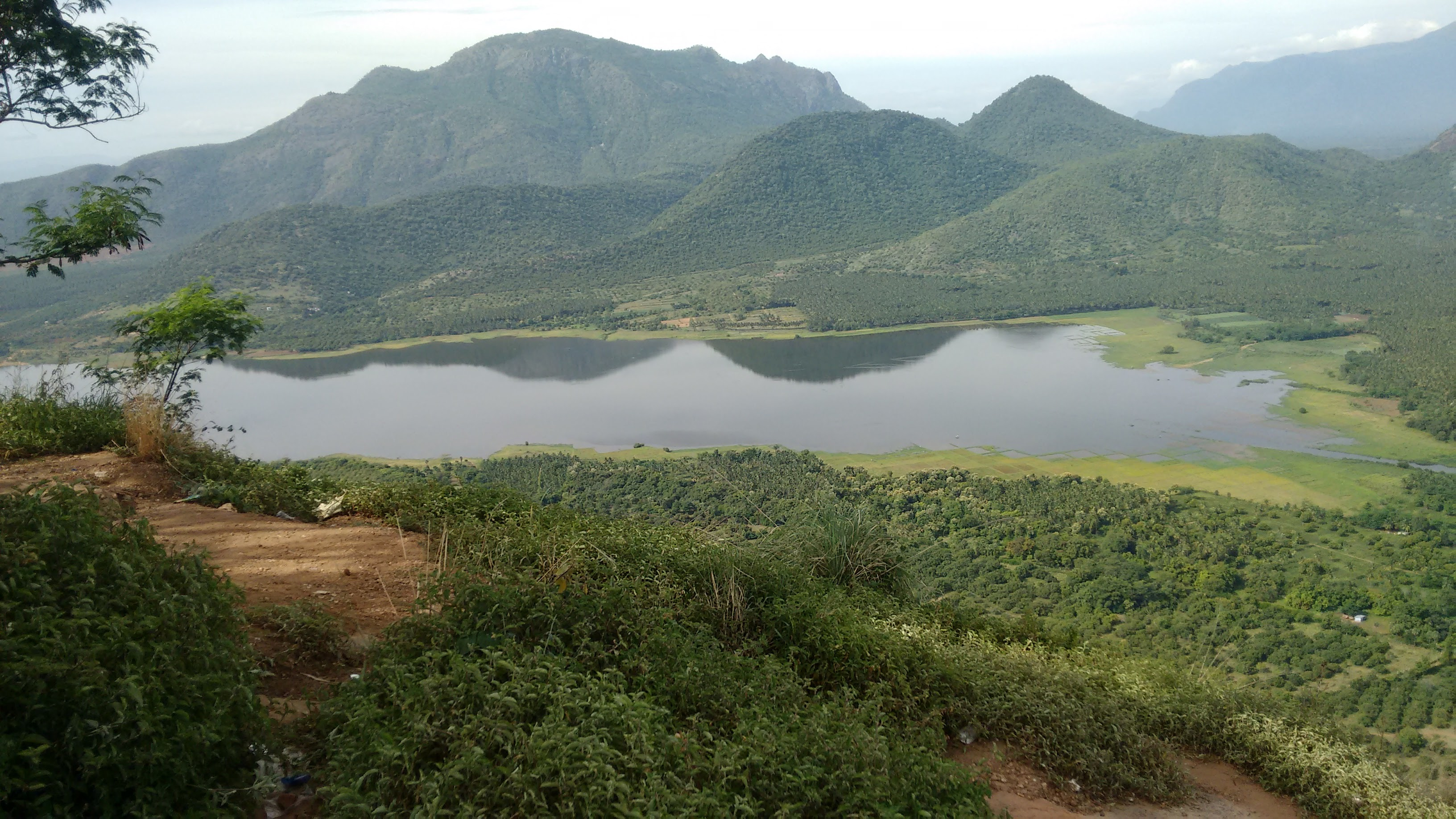
- Manjalar Dam reservoir

- Location in Tamil Nadu, India
- Coordinates: 10°8′38″N 77°38′46″E
- Country: India
- State: Tamil Nadu
- District: Theni

Population (2011)
  - Total: 19,285

Languages
  - Official: Tamil
- Time zone: UTC+5:30 (IST)
- PIN: 625602
- Vehicle registration: TN-60
- Website: Official website

Devadanapatti (Tamil: [teːʋadaːnappaʈʈi]) is a panchayat town in Periyakulam Taluk, a part of the Theni district in the Madurai Region in the state of Tamil Nadu, India. It is located at the bottom of the Kodaikanal Hills.

== Etymology ==
The name Devadanapatti is a combination of two Tamil words: "devadhanam" which means 'gods donated to' or 'gods gifted to' and 'Patti,' which means "village." Therefore, the meaning of Devadanapatti is a village gifted by the gods.

== Geography ==
The north and east sides of the town have panoramic views of the irrigated landscape, including paddy fields, sugar plantations, plantain fields, and coconut tree groves. Water for agriculture is supplied through the canal and the check dams across the river from Manjalar Dam, which is built down under the Kodaikanal hills. Water from the rivers Varattaru, Thalaiyar, and Iruttaaru fill the dam.

== Demographics ==
=== Population ===
According to the 2011 Census of India, Devadanapatti had a population of 19,285 people. Males made up 50.8% (9,797) of the population and females made up 49.15% (9,488). The total literate population was 12,563, a literacy rate of 65%, with 7,033 literate males and 5,530 literate females. 10.8% of the population was under six years of age. 85.99% of the town was Hindu, and 13.44% were Muslim.

== Government and politics ==
=== Civic Utility / Amenities / Services ===
There is a primary healthcare hospital run by the Tamil Nadu government. Devadanapatti also has a police station and a post office. There is a weekly market that sells groceries and cattle. 24-hour bus access is provided by the Theni and Dindigul main road.

== Economy ==
Agriculture is the primary income source for residents.

== Culture/Cityscape ==
=== Landmarks ===
An ancient Kamakshi temple called the Moongilanai Kamakshi temple was built here. The main door of the temple is never opened and poojas are performed only at the door. Maha Shivaratri (Tamil month of Masi) in March is the only festival that is celebrated inside the temple. The story of the temple is described in the Tamil movie "Mahashakti Mariamman".

An ancient Paramashwarar temple called the Murugamalai Parameshwarar Parvathi temple is placed over Murugamalai hill about 5000 feet from land. Which the gods are indicates as Sayambu Lingam and Thayaar. Thiru Karthigai (Tamil month of Karthigai) in November/ December is the grand festival that is celebrated on full moon day. And Deepa Jothi maden by temple over the hill top on that day evening as same as Thiruvannaamalai. Every month special poojas also gelding on every special occasions.

== Education ==
This town panchayat has four schools: a higher secondary school run by Tamil Nadu Government, a middle school run by the Hindu management, a primary school run by the Church of South India, and another Kallar primary school run by the Tamil Nadu government.
