= Papparapatti, Salem =

Papparapatti
- Census town
- Location in Salem, India Papparapatti (Tamil Nadu) Papparapatti (India)
- Coordinates: 11°32′43″N 78°04′19″E
- Country: India
- State: Tamil Nadu
- District: Salem
- Metro: Salem Metropolitan Area

Population (2001)
  - Total: 9,020

Languages
  - Official: Tamil
- Time zone: UTC+5:30 (IST)

Papparapatti is a census town in Salem district in the Indian state of Tamil Nadu.

== Demographics ==
As of the 2001 India census, Papparapatti had a population of 9020. Males constitute 52% of the population and females 48%. Papparapatti has an average literacy rate of 56%, lower than the national average of 59.5%: male literacy is 64%, and female literacy is 47%. In Papparapatti, 12% of the population is under 6 years of age.
