= Batlagundu =

Batlagundu Vathalagundu
- Town
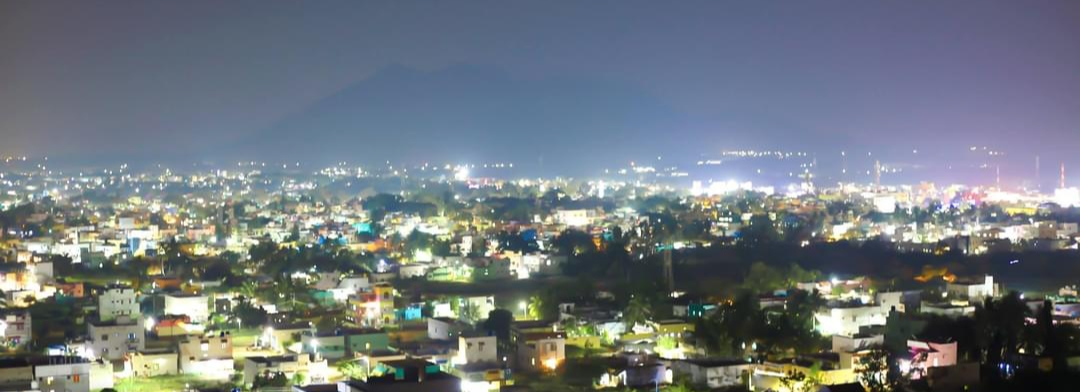
- Night view of Vathalagundu
- Nickname: Vathilai
- Location in Tamil Nadu, India
- Coordinates: 10.1655°N 77.7594°E
- Country: India
- State: Tamil Nadu
- Region: Pandya Nadu
- District: Dindigul district

Government
  - Type: Special level Panchayat Town
  - Body: Batlagundu Special level Panchayat Town
  - Town President: P.Chidambaram

Population (2021)
  - Total: 32,577
- Demonym: Vathalagundukaran

Languages
  - Official: Tamil
- Time zone: UTC+5:30 (IST)
- PIN: 624202
- Telephone code: 04543
- Vehicle registration: TN 57

Batlagundu officially Vathalagundu is a town in Nilakottai block in Dindigul district in the state of Tamil Nadu, India. The name Vetrilai kundru (Betel leaf hill) later transformed and changed to Vathalagundu. The town is the major gateway to Kodaikanal. Subramaniya Siva was a writer, Indian Freedom Fighter, and activist born in Batlagundu. Batlagundu is the fifth-largest town in the Dindigul district. The town is located in such a way connecting three main districts of South Tamil Nadu (Dindigul, Madurai, and Theni). Batlagundu has most of the voters in Nilakottai Constituency.

Batlagundu is closely associated with Agriculture. The Town has many agricultural lands. It has a big market getting all the vegetables and fruits afresh from the Kodai hills. Batlagundu is an important hub in the Dindigul district. The Town is home to various banana and coconut productions.

The town is believed to be significant antiquity and has been ruled at different times, by the Pandiyan, Cholas, Madurai Nayakas and the British.

== Geography ==
The Town is a gateway to the Madurai district, Theni district, and Kodaikanal. Batlagundu is surrounded by many small hills which are called "kundru" in Tamil.

=== Climate ===
As situated under the foothills of Kodaikanal, Batlagundu experiences cool breeze throughout the year, especially during the Northeast Monsoon. Batlagundu receives a good rainfall during Monsoon.

== Demographics ==
Batlagundu is a Town Panchayat city in the district of Dindigul and Nilakkottai Taluks. The Batlagundu city is divided into 18 wards for elections held every five years.

Batlagundu Town Panchayat has total Administration over 8,878 houses to which it supplies basic amenities like water and sewerage. It also authorize to build roads within Town limits and impose taxes on properties coming under its jurisdiction.

In the 2001 India census, Batlagundu (PIN: 624202) had a population of 22,007. Males constitute 51% of the population and females 49%. Batlagundu has an average literacy rate of 76%, higher than the national average of 59.5%; with 54% of the males and 46% of females literate. 9% of the population is under 6 years of age. According to the 2011 census, the town had a population of 32577.

=== Religion ===
There are several temple, mosque and church in the area. Some prominent ones are:

- Mariamman temple at Old Batlagundu is the popular goddess in this region, and the festival is held in this temple every year is locally famous.
- St.Thomas Church is the popular catholic church located at the center of the town.
- Sri Lakshmi Narayana Perumal Temple The temple is situated on the banks of the Manjalaru. The presiding deity is Sri Lakshmi Narayana Perumal with his consort, Lakshmi, on his lap. The temple built in the Pandyas period and about 700 years old.
- Arulmigu Bhadravathi Bhavanarishi Sametha "Sri Markandeyar Temple" is an ancient temple Situated in Batlagundu. Lord Markandeyar is the deity in this temple. The Shivaratri festival is held in this temple.
- Sri Sendraya Perumal Temple - There is an ancient temple of Sri Sendraya Perumal situated on a hill near old Batlagundu. Lord Vishnu is worshiped in this temple as Sri Sendraya Perumal.
- Sri Valikeshwara Shiva temple near banks of the vaigai river
- Sri Kashi Viswanathar and Visalakshmi Amman temple in the Agraharam which houses a rare Mahameru.
- Kunnuvarankottai Kasi Visalakshi-Viswanathar Temple

== Government and Administration ==
=== Civic Utility / Amenities / Services ===
Town has municipality supplied water through pipes. Telecommunication services are provided by wireless and broadband

== Town Administration ==
Town president Thiru. P.Chidambaram

Ward 1 Thiru.Ravichandran

Ward 2 Thiru.Sivakumar

Ward 3 Thirumathi.Alagurani

Ward 4 Thirumathi.Sairath Nisha

Ward 5 Thiru.Maruthan

Ward 6 Thiru.Chinadurai

Ward 7 Thiru.Mahamuni

Ward 8 Thiru.Manivannan

Ward 9 Thiru.Kangadurai

Ward 10 Thirumathi.Priya

Ward 11 Thiru.Dharmalingam

Ward 12 Thirumathi.Thamizh Arasi

Ward 13 Thirumathi.Rameeja Begum

Ward 14 Thirumathi.Ramuthai

Ward 15 Thirumathi.Sumathi

Ward 16 Thirumathi.Muthumariammal

Ward 17 Thirumathi.Shyamala

Ward 18 Thiru.Chidambaram

=== Hospitals ===
Seeing the medical needs of the surrounding community a dispensary was established by Christian missionaries during the 1970s in the name of late Rt Rev Leonard, Archbishop of Madurai. Leonard Hospital is the sole multi-specialty hospital in Batlagundu. Interestingly the 4-acre land, where this hospital now stands was originally planned to host a cinema theater. But due to the efforts of the then Chairman of the Batlagundu Panchayat, a devoted Hindu, it was allotted to the Christian institution. Theni Medical College was established during 2004 by then Chief Minister Dr. J. Jayalalitha, along with 600 bedded hospital, which is 40 km away. Government Rajaji Hospital in Madurai, established in 1842 is 60 km away. Many small medical canters and dispensaries cater to the medical need of the Town.

== Economy ==
The economy of the town is mostly dependent on agricultural products and is home to a banana leaf commission, coconut powder exports, spinning mills, and other businesses. With its proximity to the foothills of the Kodaikanal mountain range, there are wholesale businesses that involve vegetables and fruits (carrots, apples, blue cabbage, tomato, and coffee) that grow in the mountains.

== Transport ==
Batlagundu is well connected by road. Batlagundu is situated on the boundaries of Dindigul, Theni and Madurai Districts.

=== Road ===
In the residential areas of Batlagundu town, there are single lane narrow roads with pot holes. The roads are surrounded by closely built homes. Auto and taxi services are available.

Batlagundu Bus stand has buses to all major cities in Tamil Nadu, Bangalore, and Kerala.

The Kodaikanal Ghat Road has been named by the Tamil Nadu State Highway Department as SH-156. It begins at about 8 km (5.0 mi) west of Batlagundu and ends at Kodaikanal with a length of 56.8 kilometers (35.3 mi). The Road is tolled by the Kodaikanal Municipality. Batlagundu is the centre of three districts (Dindigul, Theni, and Madurai)

=== Rail ===
Batlagundu does not have a railway station. The nearest railway stations are

- Kodaikanal Road Railway Station 19.4 km
- Dindigul Junction Railway Station 36 km
- Madurai Junction railway station 54.6 km

=== Air ===
The nearest airport to Batlagundu is Madurai International Airport (65.7 km) via NH 44 and Ammaiyanaickanore.

== Education ==
=== Schools ===
There are a number of institutions offering State Board and Matriculation syllabus and an ITI. Schools include:

- Government Boys Higher Secondary School, Batlagundu
- Mahalakshmi Girls Higher Secondary School
- Jeyaseelan Matric Higher Secondary School
- Annai Velankanni Matric Higher Secondary School
- Saradha Vidhyalaya Matric Higher Secondary School
- Mount Zion Matric Higher Secondary School
- Mount Zion CBSE School
- Panchayat Union School
- Sri Ram School
- First Step CBSE School
- Lakshmi Narayana School
- Apple Kids School
- Vivekananda School
- NSVV Matric Higher Secondary School
- NSVV Boys School
- NSVV Girls School
- Holy Cross Girls Higher Secondary School

=== Colleges ===
The town has no Government Colleges, but private colleges include:-

- Claudine College of Nursing. Leonard Hospital
- DMS Nursing Institute
- Kanzur Rashad Arabic College
- Kasi Nursing Institute
- Krishna polytechnic college
- National College, Batlagundu
- PVP Engineering College
- Teacher training Institute, Batlagundu

== Notable people ==
- Sachchidananda Bharati I and Sri Abhinava Narasimha Bharati, pontiffs of Sringeri Sharada Peetham in the 16th century.
- C. S. Chellappa (1912–1998), Indian writer, journalist, and Indian independence movement activist. He belonged to the "Manikkodi" literary movement in Tamil literature.
- B. R. Rajam Iyer (1872–1898), Indian lawyer and writer who wrote in Tamil and English.
- Navi Pillay (born 1941), South African lawyer and judge with ancestral relations to Batlagundu, 2026 Nobel Peace Prize winner
- B. S. Ramiah (1905–1983), Indian writer, journalist, and critic. He was also a script and dialogue writer in Tamil films.
- Subramaniya Siva (1884–1925) Indian writer and Indian independence activist.
